

480001–480100 

|-bgcolor=#d6d6d6
| 480001 ||  || — || December 13, 2006 || Mount Lemmon || Mount Lemmon Survey || — || align=right | 3.1 km || 
|-id=002 bgcolor=#d6d6d6
| 480002 ||  || — || March 14, 2008 || Catalina || CSS || — || align=right | 3.6 km || 
|-id=003 bgcolor=#d6d6d6
| 480003 ||  || — || June 19, 2009 || Kitt Peak || Spacewatch || — || align=right | 3.4 km || 
|-id=004 bgcolor=#FFC2E0
| 480004 ||  || — || April 15, 2010 || Mount Lemmon || Mount Lemmon Survey || AMO +1km || align=right | 1.2 km || 
|-id=005 bgcolor=#E9E9E9
| 480005 ||  || — || November 14, 2007 || Mount Lemmon || Mount Lemmon Survey || — || align=right | 3.0 km || 
|-id=006 bgcolor=#d6d6d6
| 480006 ||  || — || December 25, 2011 || Kitt Peak || Spacewatch || EOS || align=right | 1.7 km || 
|-id=007 bgcolor=#d6d6d6
| 480007 ||  || — || April 6, 2008 || Kitt Peak || Spacewatch || VER || align=right | 2.3 km || 
|-id=008 bgcolor=#fefefe
| 480008 ||  || — || November 6, 2005 || Kitt Peak || Spacewatch || — || align=right | 1.2 km || 
|-id=009 bgcolor=#d6d6d6
| 480009 ||  || — || October 1, 2005 || Mount Lemmon || Mount Lemmon Survey || — || align=right | 2.9 km || 
|-id=010 bgcolor=#d6d6d6
| 480010 ||  || — || May 22, 2010 || WISE || WISE || Tj (2.99) || align=right | 5.6 km || 
|-id=011 bgcolor=#d6d6d6
| 480011 ||  || — || September 27, 2005 || Kitt Peak || Spacewatch || — || align=right | 2.7 km || 
|-id=012 bgcolor=#E9E9E9
| 480012 ||  || — || March 9, 2005 || Catalina || CSS || — || align=right | 1.3 km || 
|-id=013 bgcolor=#d6d6d6
| 480013 ||  || — || February 25, 2007 || Kitt Peak || Spacewatch || — || align=right | 2.8 km || 
|-id=014 bgcolor=#E9E9E9
| 480014 ||  || — || March 31, 2009 || Catalina || CSS || — || align=right | 2.8 km || 
|-id=015 bgcolor=#d6d6d6
| 480015 ||  || — || January 17, 2007 || Mount Lemmon || Mount Lemmon Survey || — || align=right | 2.5 km || 
|-id=016 bgcolor=#d6d6d6
| 480016 ||  || — || January 4, 2012 || Mount Lemmon || Mount Lemmon Survey || — || align=right | 3.4 km || 
|-id=017 bgcolor=#C2E0FF
| 480017 ||  || — || October 2, 2013 || Haleakala || Pan-STARRS || SDO || align=right | 221 km || 
|-id=018 bgcolor=#fefefe
| 480018 ||  || — || February 19, 2010 || Siding Spring || SSS || H || align=right data-sort-value="0.86" | 860 m || 
|-id=019 bgcolor=#FA8072
| 480019 ||  || — || March 13, 2005 || Anderson Mesa || LONEOS || H || align=right data-sort-value="0.68" | 680 m || 
|-id=020 bgcolor=#fefefe
| 480020 ||  || — || January 24, 2007 || Socorro || LINEAR || H || align=right data-sort-value="0.60" | 600 m || 
|-id=021 bgcolor=#fefefe
| 480021 ||  || — || January 18, 2005 || Kitt Peak || Spacewatch || — || align=right | 1.2 km || 
|-id=022 bgcolor=#fefefe
| 480022 ||  || — || December 11, 2006 || Kitt Peak || Spacewatch || H || align=right data-sort-value="0.82" | 820 m || 
|-id=023 bgcolor=#fefefe
| 480023 ||  || — || September 6, 2008 || Mount Lemmon || Mount Lemmon Survey || H || align=right data-sort-value="0.68" | 680 m || 
|-id=024 bgcolor=#fefefe
| 480024 ||  || — || December 15, 2014 || Kitt Peak || Spacewatch || H || align=right data-sort-value="0.82" | 820 m || 
|-id=025 bgcolor=#fefefe
| 480025 ||  || — || February 16, 2010 || Kitt Peak || Spacewatch || H || align=right data-sort-value="0.52" | 520 m || 
|-id=026 bgcolor=#E9E9E9
| 480026 ||  || — || January 27, 2006 || Mount Lemmon || Mount Lemmon Survey || — || align=right | 1.6 km || 
|-id=027 bgcolor=#fefefe
| 480027 ||  || — || August 20, 2008 || Kitt Peak || Spacewatch || H || align=right data-sort-value="0.54" | 540 m || 
|-id=028 bgcolor=#fefefe
| 480028 ||  || — || November 14, 2006 || Mount Lemmon || Mount Lemmon Survey || H || align=right data-sort-value="0.98" | 980 m || 
|-id=029 bgcolor=#fefefe
| 480029 ||  || — || December 28, 2011 || Mount Lemmon || Mount Lemmon Survey || H || align=right data-sort-value="0.51" | 510 m || 
|-id=030 bgcolor=#E9E9E9
| 480030 ||  || — || December 25, 2005 || Kitt Peak || Spacewatch || EUN || align=right | 1.2 km || 
|-id=031 bgcolor=#fefefe
| 480031 ||  || — || November 14, 2010 || Mount Lemmon || Mount Lemmon Survey || — || align=right data-sort-value="0.83" | 830 m || 
|-id=032 bgcolor=#E9E9E9
| 480032 ||  || — || January 8, 2011 || Mount Lemmon || Mount Lemmon Survey || — || align=right | 1.1 km || 
|-id=033 bgcolor=#fefefe
| 480033 ||  || — || December 29, 2008 || Kitt Peak || Spacewatch || — || align=right data-sort-value="0.75" | 750 m || 
|-id=034 bgcolor=#fefefe
| 480034 ||  || — || December 19, 2004 || Mount Lemmon || Mount Lemmon Survey || — || align=right data-sort-value="0.67" | 670 m || 
|-id=035 bgcolor=#fefefe
| 480035 ||  || — || April 4, 2008 || Kitt Peak || Spacewatch || — || align=right data-sort-value="0.64" | 640 m || 
|-id=036 bgcolor=#d6d6d6
| 480036 ||  || — || January 27, 2010 || WISE || WISE || — || align=right | 2.6 km || 
|-id=037 bgcolor=#fefefe
| 480037 ||  || — || January 1, 2008 || Kitt Peak || Spacewatch || — || align=right data-sort-value="0.77" | 770 m || 
|-id=038 bgcolor=#fefefe
| 480038 ||  || — || March 13, 2012 || Mount Lemmon || Mount Lemmon Survey || — || align=right data-sort-value="0.58" | 580 m || 
|-id=039 bgcolor=#fefefe
| 480039 ||  || — || September 16, 2009 || Mount Lemmon || Mount Lemmon Survey || — || align=right data-sort-value="0.80" | 800 m || 
|-id=040 bgcolor=#fefefe
| 480040 ||  || — || January 13, 2011 || Kitt Peak || Spacewatch || MAS || align=right data-sort-value="0.68" | 680 m || 
|-id=041 bgcolor=#fefefe
| 480041 ||  || — || November 27, 2006 || Kitt Peak || Spacewatch || V || align=right data-sort-value="0.76" | 760 m || 
|-id=042 bgcolor=#fefefe
| 480042 ||  || — || March 17, 2012 || Mount Lemmon || Mount Lemmon Survey || — || align=right data-sort-value="0.49" | 490 m || 
|-id=043 bgcolor=#fefefe
| 480043 ||  || — || August 31, 2005 || Kitt Peak || Spacewatch || — || align=right data-sort-value="0.82" | 820 m || 
|-id=044 bgcolor=#fefefe
| 480044 ||  || — || October 31, 2005 || Mount Lemmon || Mount Lemmon Survey || NYS || align=right data-sort-value="0.83" | 830 m || 
|-id=045 bgcolor=#fefefe
| 480045 ||  || — || August 19, 2006 || Kitt Peak || Spacewatch || — || align=right data-sort-value="0.73" | 730 m || 
|-id=046 bgcolor=#fefefe
| 480046 ||  || — || April 25, 2007 || Kitt Peak || Spacewatch || H || align=right data-sort-value="0.48" | 480 m || 
|-id=047 bgcolor=#fefefe
| 480047 ||  || — || March 8, 2005 || Socorro || LINEAR || H || align=right data-sort-value="0.59" | 590 m || 
|-id=048 bgcolor=#fefefe
| 480048 ||  || — || March 29, 2012 || Kitt Peak || Spacewatch || — || align=right data-sort-value="0.75" | 750 m || 
|-id=049 bgcolor=#fefefe
| 480049 ||  || — || March 26, 2008 || Mount Lemmon || Mount Lemmon Survey || — || align=right data-sort-value="0.69" | 690 m || 
|-id=050 bgcolor=#fefefe
| 480050 ||  || — || February 9, 2008 || Kitt Peak || Spacewatch || — || align=right data-sort-value="0.67" | 670 m || 
|-id=051 bgcolor=#fefefe
| 480051 ||  || — || July 30, 2008 || Kitt Peak || Spacewatch || H || align=right data-sort-value="0.52" | 520 m || 
|-id=052 bgcolor=#E9E9E9
| 480052 ||  || — || April 30, 2010 || WISE || WISE || — || align=right | 2.0 km || 
|-id=053 bgcolor=#fefefe
| 480053 ||  || — || September 18, 2003 || Kitt Peak || Spacewatch || — || align=right data-sort-value="0.76" | 760 m || 
|-id=054 bgcolor=#fefefe
| 480054 ||  || — || April 29, 2012 || Kitt Peak || Spacewatch || — || align=right data-sort-value="0.71" | 710 m || 
|-id=055 bgcolor=#E9E9E9
| 480055 ||  || — || January 31, 2006 || Kitt Peak || Spacewatch || — || align=right | 1.6 km || 
|-id=056 bgcolor=#fefefe
| 480056 ||  || — || August 29, 2005 || Kitt Peak || Spacewatch || H || align=right data-sort-value="0.63" | 630 m || 
|-id=057 bgcolor=#E9E9E9
| 480057 ||  || — || March 28, 2011 || Kitt Peak || Spacewatch || — || align=right | 1.5 km || 
|-id=058 bgcolor=#fefefe
| 480058 ||  || — || April 2, 2005 || Catalina || CSS || H || align=right data-sort-value="0.71" | 710 m || 
|-id=059 bgcolor=#fefefe
| 480059 ||  || — || September 15, 2006 || Kitt Peak || Spacewatch || — || align=right data-sort-value="0.73" | 730 m || 
|-id=060 bgcolor=#fefefe
| 480060 ||  || — || March 13, 2012 || Mount Lemmon || Mount Lemmon Survey || — || align=right data-sort-value="0.54" | 540 m || 
|-id=061 bgcolor=#fefefe
| 480061 ||  || — || August 18, 2006 || Kitt Peak || Spacewatch || — || align=right data-sort-value="0.62" | 620 m || 
|-id=062 bgcolor=#fefefe
| 480062 ||  || — || March 15, 2012 || Kitt Peak || Spacewatch || — || align=right data-sort-value="0.62" | 620 m || 
|-id=063 bgcolor=#fefefe
| 480063 ||  || — || May 13, 2004 || Kitt Peak || Spacewatch || — || align=right data-sort-value="0.68" | 680 m || 
|-id=064 bgcolor=#fefefe
| 480064 ||  || — || February 28, 2008 || Mount Lemmon || Mount Lemmon Survey || — || align=right data-sort-value="0.65" | 650 m || 
|-id=065 bgcolor=#fefefe
| 480065 ||  || — || October 2, 2009 || Mount Lemmon || Mount Lemmon Survey || — || align=right data-sort-value="0.79" | 790 m || 
|-id=066 bgcolor=#fefefe
| 480066 ||  || — || February 26, 2011 || Mount Lemmon || Mount Lemmon Survey || — || align=right data-sort-value="0.74" | 740 m || 
|-id=067 bgcolor=#fefefe
| 480067 ||  || — || March 3, 1997 || Kitt Peak || Spacewatch || H || align=right data-sort-value="0.49" | 490 m || 
|-id=068 bgcolor=#fefefe
| 480068 ||  || — || March 22, 2012 || Mount Lemmon || Mount Lemmon Survey || — || align=right data-sort-value="0.50" | 500 m || 
|-id=069 bgcolor=#E9E9E9
| 480069 ||  || — || December 20, 2009 || Kitt Peak || Spacewatch || EUN || align=right | 1.1 km || 
|-id=070 bgcolor=#E9E9E9
| 480070 ||  || — || April 7, 2006 || Anderson Mesa || LONEOS || — || align=right | 3.8 km || 
|-id=071 bgcolor=#fefefe
| 480071 ||  || — || January 10, 2007 || Kitt Peak || Spacewatch || — || align=right data-sort-value="0.78" | 780 m || 
|-id=072 bgcolor=#fefefe
| 480072 ||  || — || February 1, 2012 || Catalina || CSS || H || align=right data-sort-value="0.86" | 860 m || 
|-id=073 bgcolor=#fefefe
| 480073 ||  || — || July 3, 2005 || Mount Lemmon || Mount Lemmon Survey || H || align=right data-sort-value="0.56" | 560 m || 
|-id=074 bgcolor=#fefefe
| 480074 ||  || — || January 9, 2011 || Mount Lemmon || Mount Lemmon Survey || — || align=right | 1.0 km || 
|-id=075 bgcolor=#fefefe
| 480075 ||  || — || September 25, 2005 || Kitt Peak || Spacewatch || H || align=right data-sort-value="0.59" | 590 m || 
|-id=076 bgcolor=#fefefe
| 480076 ||  || — || October 21, 2003 || Kitt Peak || Spacewatch || H || align=right data-sort-value="0.69" | 690 m || 
|-id=077 bgcolor=#fefefe
| 480077 ||  || — || October 29, 2005 || Mount Lemmon || Mount Lemmon Survey || NYS || align=right data-sort-value="0.69" | 690 m || 
|-id=078 bgcolor=#fefefe
| 480078 ||  || — || November 24, 2003 || Kitt Peak || Spacewatch || — || align=right data-sort-value="0.76" | 760 m || 
|-id=079 bgcolor=#fefefe
| 480079 ||  || — || February 25, 2007 || Mount Lemmon || Mount Lemmon Survey || — || align=right data-sort-value="0.89" | 890 m || 
|-id=080 bgcolor=#fefefe
| 480080 ||  || — || April 19, 2004 || Socorro || LINEAR || — || align=right | 1.2 km || 
|-id=081 bgcolor=#d6d6d6
| 480081 ||  || — || December 31, 2007 || Kitt Peak || Spacewatch || — || align=right | 3.5 km || 
|-id=082 bgcolor=#E9E9E9
| 480082 ||  || — || May 25, 2006 || Mount Lemmon || Mount Lemmon Survey || — || align=right | 2.0 km || 
|-id=083 bgcolor=#E9E9E9
| 480083 ||  || — || March 21, 2010 || Mount Lemmon || Mount Lemmon Survey || — || align=right | 2.2 km || 
|-id=084 bgcolor=#E9E9E9
| 480084 ||  || — || January 7, 2010 || Kitt Peak || Spacewatch || — || align=right | 1.5 km || 
|-id=085 bgcolor=#fefefe
| 480085 ||  || — || November 20, 2006 || Kitt Peak || Spacewatch || — || align=right data-sort-value="0.78" | 780 m || 
|-id=086 bgcolor=#fefefe
| 480086 ||  || — || October 17, 2011 || Kitt Peak || Spacewatch || H || align=right data-sort-value="0.52" | 520 m || 
|-id=087 bgcolor=#fefefe
| 480087 ||  || — || December 7, 1996 || Kitt Peak || Spacewatch || — || align=right data-sort-value="0.91" | 910 m || 
|-id=088 bgcolor=#fefefe
| 480088 ||  || — || January 13, 2011 || Mount Lemmon || Mount Lemmon Survey || — || align=right data-sort-value="0.84" | 840 m || 
|-id=089 bgcolor=#fefefe
| 480089 ||  || — || April 20, 2004 || Socorro || LINEAR || — || align=right | 1.1 km || 
|-id=090 bgcolor=#E9E9E9
| 480090 ||  || — || February 8, 2011 || Mount Lemmon || Mount Lemmon Survey || JUN || align=right data-sort-value="0.98" | 980 m || 
|-id=091 bgcolor=#E9E9E9
| 480091 ||  || — || March 27, 2003 || Kitt Peak || Spacewatch || — || align=right data-sort-value="0.73" | 730 m || 
|-id=092 bgcolor=#fefefe
| 480092 ||  || — || February 9, 2005 || Kitt Peak || Spacewatch || H || align=right data-sort-value="0.44" | 440 m || 
|-id=093 bgcolor=#fefefe
| 480093 ||  || — || March 17, 2004 || Kitt Peak || Spacewatch || MAS || align=right data-sort-value="0.68" | 680 m || 
|-id=094 bgcolor=#FA8072
| 480094 ||  || — || February 9, 2007 || Kitt Peak || Spacewatch || H || align=right data-sort-value="0.71" | 710 m || 
|-id=095 bgcolor=#E9E9E9
| 480095 ||  || — || September 11, 2007 || Mount Lemmon || Mount Lemmon Survey || — || align=right | 2.1 km || 
|-id=096 bgcolor=#fefefe
| 480096 ||  || — || March 1, 2008 || Kitt Peak || Spacewatch || — || align=right data-sort-value="0.80" | 800 m || 
|-id=097 bgcolor=#E9E9E9
| 480097 ||  || — || April 23, 2006 || Anderson Mesa || LONEOS || — || align=right | 2.8 km || 
|-id=098 bgcolor=#fefefe
| 480098 ||  || — || March 23, 2004 || Socorro || LINEAR || — || align=right data-sort-value="0.75" | 750 m || 
|-id=099 bgcolor=#E9E9E9
| 480099 ||  || — || August 10, 2012 || Kitt Peak || Spacewatch || — || align=right | 1.8 km || 
|-id=100 bgcolor=#fefefe
| 480100 ||  || — || September 23, 2008 || Mount Lemmon || Mount Lemmon Survey || H || align=right data-sort-value="0.52" | 520 m || 
|}

480101–480200 

|-bgcolor=#fefefe
| 480101 ||  || — || January 14, 2012 || Kitt Peak || Spacewatch || H || align=right data-sort-value="0.59" | 590 m || 
|-id=102 bgcolor=#fefefe
| 480102 ||  || — || April 11, 2005 || Mount Lemmon || Mount Lemmon Survey || — || align=right data-sort-value="0.72" | 720 m || 
|-id=103 bgcolor=#d6d6d6
| 480103 ||  || — || April 22, 2010 || WISE || WISE || — || align=right | 2.7 km || 
|-id=104 bgcolor=#fefefe
| 480104 ||  || — || September 26, 2006 || Mount Lemmon || Mount Lemmon Survey || V || align=right data-sort-value="0.67" | 670 m || 
|-id=105 bgcolor=#fefefe
| 480105 ||  || — || September 14, 2005 || Kitt Peak || Spacewatch || V || align=right data-sort-value="0.71" | 710 m || 
|-id=106 bgcolor=#d6d6d6
| 480106 ||  || — || October 10, 2005 || Kitt Peak || Spacewatch || — || align=right | 2.7 km || 
|-id=107 bgcolor=#fefefe
| 480107 ||  || — || March 12, 2008 || Mount Lemmon || Mount Lemmon Survey || — || align=right data-sort-value="0.77" | 770 m || 
|-id=108 bgcolor=#d6d6d6
| 480108 ||  || — || April 18, 2010 || WISE || WISE || LIX || align=right | 2.5 km || 
|-id=109 bgcolor=#d6d6d6
| 480109 ||  || — || June 9, 2010 || WISE || WISE || — || align=right | 2.7 km || 
|-id=110 bgcolor=#E9E9E9
| 480110 ||  || — || November 30, 2005 || Mount Lemmon || Mount Lemmon Survey || MAR || align=right | 1.3 km || 
|-id=111 bgcolor=#d6d6d6
| 480111 ||  || — || March 26, 2004 || Kitt Peak || Spacewatch || — || align=right | 2.3 km || 
|-id=112 bgcolor=#E9E9E9
| 480112 ||  || — || May 8, 2006 || Mount Lemmon || Mount Lemmon Survey || — || align=right | 2.0 km || 
|-id=113 bgcolor=#fefefe
| 480113 ||  || — || March 29, 2011 || Mount Lemmon || Mount Lemmon Survey || — || align=right data-sort-value="0.86" | 860 m || 
|-id=114 bgcolor=#d6d6d6
| 480114 ||  || — || October 1, 2005 || Mount Lemmon || Mount Lemmon Survey || THB || align=right | 2.2 km || 
|-id=115 bgcolor=#E9E9E9
| 480115 ||  || — || April 29, 2011 || Mount Lemmon || Mount Lemmon Survey || EUN || align=right | 1.1 km || 
|-id=116 bgcolor=#fefefe
| 480116 ||  || — || January 12, 2011 || Kitt Peak || Spacewatch || — || align=right data-sort-value="0.86" | 860 m || 
|-id=117 bgcolor=#fefefe
| 480117 ||  || — || April 14, 2008 || Catalina || CSS || — || align=right data-sort-value="0.88" | 880 m || 
|-id=118 bgcolor=#fefefe
| 480118 ||  || — || July 3, 1995 || Kitt Peak || Spacewatch || — || align=right data-sort-value="0.76" | 760 m || 
|-id=119 bgcolor=#fefefe
| 480119 ||  || — || April 10, 2005 || Mount Lemmon || Mount Lemmon Survey || — || align=right data-sort-value="0.73" | 730 m || 
|-id=120 bgcolor=#fefefe
| 480120 ||  || — || June 15, 2012 || Mount Lemmon || Mount Lemmon Survey || — || align=right data-sort-value="0.82" | 820 m || 
|-id=121 bgcolor=#fefefe
| 480121 ||  || — || January 11, 2011 || Mount Lemmon || Mount Lemmon Survey || V || align=right data-sort-value="0.54" | 540 m || 
|-id=122 bgcolor=#fefefe
| 480122 ||  || — || September 16, 2009 || Kitt Peak || Spacewatch || — || align=right | 1.0 km || 
|-id=123 bgcolor=#fefefe
| 480123 ||  || — || October 31, 2010 || Kitt Peak || Spacewatch || — || align=right data-sort-value="0.70" | 700 m || 
|-id=124 bgcolor=#fefefe
| 480124 ||  || — || September 19, 2009 || Mount Lemmon || Mount Lemmon Survey || V || align=right data-sort-value="0.85" | 850 m || 
|-id=125 bgcolor=#fefefe
| 480125 ||  || — || February 9, 2005 || Kitt Peak || Spacewatch || — || align=right data-sort-value="0.81" | 810 m || 
|-id=126 bgcolor=#fefefe
| 480126 ||  || — || March 12, 2008 || Mount Lemmon || Mount Lemmon Survey || — || align=right data-sort-value="0.79" | 790 m || 
|-id=127 bgcolor=#fefefe
| 480127 ||  || — || March 10, 2005 || Kitt Peak || Spacewatch || — || align=right data-sort-value="0.86" | 860 m || 
|-id=128 bgcolor=#d6d6d6
| 480128 ||  || — || September 8, 2011 || Kitt Peak || Spacewatch || — || align=right | 2.6 km || 
|-id=129 bgcolor=#d6d6d6
| 480129 ||  || — || October 4, 1994 || Kitt Peak || Spacewatch || — || align=right | 2.1 km || 
|-id=130 bgcolor=#E9E9E9
| 480130 ||  || — || September 23, 2008 || Mount Lemmon || Mount Lemmon Survey || — || align=right | 1.0 km || 
|-id=131 bgcolor=#fefefe
| 480131 ||  || — || October 27, 2005 || Kitt Peak || Spacewatch || — || align=right data-sort-value="0.77" | 770 m || 
|-id=132 bgcolor=#fefefe
| 480132 ||  || — || August 29, 2000 || Socorro || LINEAR || — || align=right data-sort-value="0.78" | 780 m || 
|-id=133 bgcolor=#fefefe
| 480133 ||  || — || March 9, 2011 || Mount Lemmon || Mount Lemmon Survey || — || align=right data-sort-value="0.75" | 750 m || 
|-id=134 bgcolor=#fefefe
| 480134 ||  || — || March 16, 2004 || Kitt Peak || Spacewatch || NYS || align=right data-sort-value="0.54" | 540 m || 
|-id=135 bgcolor=#fefefe
| 480135 ||  || — || March 13, 2011 || Kitt Peak || Spacewatch || — || align=right data-sort-value="0.93" | 930 m || 
|-id=136 bgcolor=#E9E9E9
| 480136 ||  || — || October 31, 2008 || Kitt Peak || Spacewatch || — || align=right | 2.1 km || 
|-id=137 bgcolor=#fefefe
| 480137 ||  || — || November 25, 2005 || Kitt Peak || Spacewatch || — || align=right data-sort-value="0.81" | 810 m || 
|-id=138 bgcolor=#E9E9E9
| 480138 ||  || — || December 22, 2005 || Kitt Peak || Spacewatch || — || align=right | 1.1 km || 
|-id=139 bgcolor=#E9E9E9
| 480139 ||  || — || September 14, 2007 || Kitt Peak || Spacewatch || — || align=right | 2.0 km || 
|-id=140 bgcolor=#fefefe
| 480140 ||  || — || March 11, 2005 || Kitt Peak || Spacewatch || — || align=right data-sort-value="0.68" | 680 m || 
|-id=141 bgcolor=#fefefe
| 480141 ||  || — || January 19, 2008 || Mount Lemmon || Mount Lemmon Survey || — || align=right data-sort-value="0.64" | 640 m || 
|-id=142 bgcolor=#E9E9E9
| 480142 ||  || — || March 2, 2006 || Mount Lemmon || Mount Lemmon Survey || ADE || align=right | 1.7 km || 
|-id=143 bgcolor=#d6d6d6
| 480143 ||  || — || May 16, 2010 || Mount Lemmon || Mount Lemmon Survey || — || align=right | 2.6 km || 
|-id=144 bgcolor=#fefefe
| 480144 ||  || — || November 2, 2010 || Mount Lemmon || Mount Lemmon Survey || — || align=right data-sort-value="0.64" | 640 m || 
|-id=145 bgcolor=#fefefe
| 480145 ||  || — || September 28, 1997 || Kitt Peak || Spacewatch || — || align=right data-sort-value="0.74" | 740 m || 
|-id=146 bgcolor=#E9E9E9
| 480146 ||  || — || December 25, 2005 || Kitt Peak || Spacewatch || — || align=right | 1.5 km || 
|-id=147 bgcolor=#fefefe
| 480147 ||  || — || November 18, 2009 || Mount Lemmon || Mount Lemmon Survey || V || align=right data-sort-value="0.65" | 650 m || 
|-id=148 bgcolor=#fefefe
| 480148 ||  || — || June 14, 2012 || Kitt Peak || Spacewatch || — || align=right data-sort-value="0.65" | 650 m || 
|-id=149 bgcolor=#d6d6d6
| 480149 ||  || — || February 1, 2005 || Kitt Peak || Spacewatch || 615 || align=right | 1.4 km || 
|-id=150 bgcolor=#E9E9E9
| 480150 ||  || — || March 14, 2011 || Mount Lemmon || Mount Lemmon Survey || — || align=right | 1.3 km || 
|-id=151 bgcolor=#fefefe
| 480151 ||  || — || February 28, 2008 || Mount Lemmon || Mount Lemmon Survey || — || align=right data-sort-value="0.64" | 640 m || 
|-id=152 bgcolor=#d6d6d6
| 480152 ||  || — || May 11, 2010 || Mount Lemmon || Mount Lemmon Survey || — || align=right | 2.3 km || 
|-id=153 bgcolor=#fefefe
| 480153 ||  || — || November 24, 2009 || Kitt Peak || Spacewatch || — || align=right data-sort-value="0.76" | 760 m || 
|-id=154 bgcolor=#fefefe
| 480154 ||  || — || September 25, 2005 || Catalina || CSS || H || align=right data-sort-value="0.81" | 810 m || 
|-id=155 bgcolor=#E9E9E9
| 480155 ||  || — || June 6, 2011 || Kitt Peak || Spacewatch || EUN || align=right | 1.4 km || 
|-id=156 bgcolor=#E9E9E9
| 480156 ||  || — || September 23, 2008 || Kitt Peak || Spacewatch || — || align=right | 1.4 km || 
|-id=157 bgcolor=#E9E9E9
| 480157 ||  || — || October 6, 2008 || Mount Lemmon || Mount Lemmon Survey || — || align=right | 1.9 km || 
|-id=158 bgcolor=#fefefe
| 480158 ||  || — || October 20, 2006 || Kitt Peak || Spacewatch || — || align=right data-sort-value="0.79" | 790 m || 
|-id=159 bgcolor=#fefefe
| 480159 ||  || — || September 19, 2006 || Kitt Peak || Spacewatch || — || align=right data-sort-value="0.78" | 780 m || 
|-id=160 bgcolor=#fefefe
| 480160 ||  || — || January 10, 2008 || Kitt Peak || Spacewatch || — || align=right data-sort-value="0.71" | 710 m || 
|-id=161 bgcolor=#fefefe
| 480161 ||  || — || October 18, 2009 || Catalina || CSS || — || align=right data-sort-value="0.85" | 850 m || 
|-id=162 bgcolor=#fefefe
| 480162 ||  || — || February 23, 2011 || Catalina || CSS || — || align=right data-sort-value="0.73" | 730 m || 
|-id=163 bgcolor=#E9E9E9
| 480163 ||  || — || September 24, 2008 || Kitt Peak || Spacewatch || — || align=right | 1.2 km || 
|-id=164 bgcolor=#d6d6d6
| 480164 ||  || — || March 29, 2010 || WISE || WISE || — || align=right | 2.7 km || 
|-id=165 bgcolor=#E9E9E9
| 480165 ||  || — || December 3, 2008 || Mount Lemmon || Mount Lemmon Survey || — || align=right | 2.2 km || 
|-id=166 bgcolor=#E9E9E9
| 480166 ||  || — || September 21, 2011 || Mount Lemmon || Mount Lemmon Survey || — || align=right | 3.0 km || 
|-id=167 bgcolor=#fefefe
| 480167 ||  || — || March 27, 2008 || Mount Lemmon || Mount Lemmon Survey || — || align=right data-sort-value="0.78" | 780 m || 
|-id=168 bgcolor=#d6d6d6
| 480168 ||  || — || March 24, 2009 || Mount Lemmon || Mount Lemmon Survey || — || align=right | 2.9 km || 
|-id=169 bgcolor=#E9E9E9
| 480169 ||  || — || February 15, 2010 || Kitt Peak || Spacewatch || — || align=right | 1.3 km || 
|-id=170 bgcolor=#E9E9E9
| 480170 ||  || — || January 26, 2006 || Kitt Peak || Spacewatch || — || align=right | 1.3 km || 
|-id=171 bgcolor=#E9E9E9
| 480171 ||  || — || May 24, 2011 || Mount Lemmon || Mount Lemmon Survey || — || align=right | 1.1 km || 
|-id=172 bgcolor=#E9E9E9
| 480172 ||  || — || January 25, 2006 || Kitt Peak || Spacewatch || — || align=right | 1.4 km || 
|-id=173 bgcolor=#fefefe
| 480173 ||  || — || October 1, 2009 || Mount Lemmon || Mount Lemmon Survey || — || align=right data-sort-value="0.98" | 980 m || 
|-id=174 bgcolor=#fefefe
| 480174 ||  || — || December 7, 2013 || Mount Lemmon || Mount Lemmon Survey || — || align=right data-sort-value="0.90" | 900 m || 
|-id=175 bgcolor=#fefefe
| 480175 ||  || — || January 11, 2011 || Mount Lemmon || Mount Lemmon Survey || — || align=right data-sort-value="0.93" | 930 m || 
|-id=176 bgcolor=#fefefe
| 480176 ||  || — || May 27, 2008 || Mount Lemmon || Mount Lemmon Survey || — || align=right data-sort-value="0.78" | 780 m || 
|-id=177 bgcolor=#fefefe
| 480177 ||  || — || October 29, 2010 || Kitt Peak || Spacewatch || — || align=right data-sort-value="0.64" | 640 m || 
|-id=178 bgcolor=#fefefe
| 480178 ||  || — || January 24, 2007 || Mount Lemmon || Mount Lemmon Survey || — || align=right data-sort-value="0.79" | 790 m || 
|-id=179 bgcolor=#fefefe
| 480179 ||  || — || November 17, 2009 || Mount Lemmon || Mount Lemmon Survey || — || align=right data-sort-value="0.92" | 920 m || 
|-id=180 bgcolor=#d6d6d6
| 480180 ||  || — || October 15, 2007 || Mount Lemmon || Mount Lemmon Survey || — || align=right | 2.2 km || 
|-id=181 bgcolor=#E9E9E9
| 480181 ||  || — || May 5, 2011 || Kitt Peak || Spacewatch || — || align=right | 1.4 km || 
|-id=182 bgcolor=#fefefe
| 480182 ||  || — || March 9, 1997 || Kitt Peak || Spacewatch || — || align=right data-sort-value="0.71" | 710 m || 
|-id=183 bgcolor=#fefefe
| 480183 ||  || — || April 8, 2008 || Kitt Peak || Spacewatch || — || align=right data-sort-value="0.74" | 740 m || 
|-id=184 bgcolor=#fefefe
| 480184 ||  || — || July 5, 2010 || Mount Lemmon || Mount Lemmon Survey || H || align=right data-sort-value="0.78" | 780 m || 
|-id=185 bgcolor=#FA8072
| 480185 ||  || — || May 14, 2010 || Mount Lemmon || Mount Lemmon Survey || H || align=right data-sort-value="0.76" | 760 m || 
|-id=186 bgcolor=#E9E9E9
| 480186 ||  || — || February 14, 2010 || Mount Lemmon || Mount Lemmon Survey || — || align=right | 2.3 km || 
|-id=187 bgcolor=#E9E9E9
| 480187 ||  || — || April 19, 2006 || Mount Lemmon || Mount Lemmon Survey || — || align=right | 1.4 km || 
|-id=188 bgcolor=#d6d6d6
| 480188 ||  || — || April 13, 2010 || WISE || WISE || — || align=right | 2.2 km || 
|-id=189 bgcolor=#d6d6d6
| 480189 ||  || — || February 24, 2010 || WISE || WISE || — || align=right | 2.2 km || 
|-id=190 bgcolor=#E9E9E9
| 480190 ||  || — || May 23, 2011 || Mount Lemmon || Mount Lemmon Survey || — || align=right | 1.2 km || 
|-id=191 bgcolor=#E9E9E9
| 480191 ||  || — || February 24, 2006 || Anderson Mesa || LONEOS || EUN || align=right | 1.5 km || 
|-id=192 bgcolor=#d6d6d6
| 480192 ||  || — || November 8, 2007 || Mount Lemmon || Mount Lemmon Survey || — || align=right | 2.8 km || 
|-id=193 bgcolor=#E9E9E9
| 480193 ||  || — || December 25, 2013 || Mount Lemmon || Mount Lemmon Survey || — || align=right | 1.7 km || 
|-id=194 bgcolor=#E9E9E9
| 480194 ||  || — || October 24, 2008 || Kitt Peak || Spacewatch || — || align=right | 1.6 km || 
|-id=195 bgcolor=#d6d6d6
| 480195 ||  || — || August 14, 2010 || WISE || WISE || Tj (2.91) || align=right | 3.6 km || 
|-id=196 bgcolor=#E9E9E9
| 480196 ||  || — || August 21, 2007 || Anderson Mesa || LONEOS || — || align=right | 2.0 km || 
|-id=197 bgcolor=#E9E9E9
| 480197 ||  || — || October 26, 2008 || Kitt Peak || Spacewatch || — || align=right | 2.0 km || 
|-id=198 bgcolor=#d6d6d6
| 480198 ||  || — || October 2, 2006 || Mount Lemmon || Mount Lemmon Survey || — || align=right | 3.1 km || 
|-id=199 bgcolor=#d6d6d6
| 480199 ||  || — || March 25, 2010 || WISE || WISE || — || align=right | 3.9 km || 
|-id=200 bgcolor=#E9E9E9
| 480200 ||  || — || April 5, 2011 || Siding Spring || SSS || — || align=right | 1.8 km || 
|}

480201–480300 

|-bgcolor=#fefefe
| 480201 ||  || — || March 1, 2005 || Kitt Peak || Spacewatch || — || align=right data-sort-value="0.87" | 870 m || 
|-id=202 bgcolor=#fefefe
| 480202 ||  || — || March 10, 2007 || Mount Lemmon || Mount Lemmon Survey || — || align=right data-sort-value="0.87" | 870 m || 
|-id=203 bgcolor=#fefefe
| 480203 ||  || — || January 11, 2008 || Mount Lemmon || Mount Lemmon Survey || — || align=right data-sort-value="0.62" | 620 m || 
|-id=204 bgcolor=#fefefe
| 480204 ||  || — || March 11, 2005 || Mount Lemmon || Mount Lemmon Survey || — || align=right data-sort-value="0.87" | 870 m || 
|-id=205 bgcolor=#d6d6d6
| 480205 ||  || — || November 21, 2008 || Mount Lemmon || Mount Lemmon Survey || — || align=right | 2.9 km || 
|-id=206 bgcolor=#FA8072
| 480206 ||  || — || February 25, 2007 || Catalina || CSS || H || align=right data-sort-value="0.68" | 680 m || 
|-id=207 bgcolor=#fefefe
| 480207 ||  || — || May 12, 2012 || Mount Lemmon || Mount Lemmon Survey || — || align=right data-sort-value="0.79" | 790 m || 
|-id=208 bgcolor=#fefefe
| 480208 ||  || — || May 6, 2008 || Mount Lemmon || Mount Lemmon Survey || — || align=right data-sort-value="0.82" | 820 m || 
|-id=209 bgcolor=#d6d6d6
| 480209 ||  || — || March 20, 2004 || Socorro || LINEAR || — || align=right | 3.1 km || 
|-id=210 bgcolor=#FA8072
| 480210 ||  || — || February 10, 2007 || Catalina || CSS || H || align=right data-sort-value="0.70" | 700 m || 
|-id=211 bgcolor=#fefefe
| 480211 ||  || — || November 20, 2003 || Kitt Peak || Spacewatch || — || align=right data-sort-value="0.63" | 630 m || 
|-id=212 bgcolor=#fefefe
| 480212 ||  || — || October 22, 2005 || Kitt Peak || Spacewatch || MAS || align=right data-sort-value="0.71" | 710 m || 
|-id=213 bgcolor=#E9E9E9
| 480213 ||  || — || March 24, 2006 || Mount Lemmon || Mount Lemmon Survey || — || align=right | 1.4 km || 
|-id=214 bgcolor=#E9E9E9
| 480214 ||  || — || June 23, 2011 || Kitt Peak || Spacewatch || — || align=right | 1.6 km || 
|-id=215 bgcolor=#d6d6d6
| 480215 ||  || — || May 13, 2010 || Mount Lemmon || Mount Lemmon Survey || — || align=right | 2.5 km || 
|-id=216 bgcolor=#fefefe
| 480216 ||  || — || August 29, 2005 || Kitt Peak || Spacewatch || — || align=right data-sort-value="0.57" | 570 m || 
|-id=217 bgcolor=#fefefe
| 480217 ||  || — || February 17, 2004 || Kitt Peak || Spacewatch || NYS || align=right data-sort-value="0.66" | 660 m || 
|-id=218 bgcolor=#fefefe
| 480218 ||  || — || April 19, 2004 || Kitt Peak || Spacewatch || — || align=right data-sort-value="0.76" | 760 m || 
|-id=219 bgcolor=#fefefe
| 480219 ||  || — || September 26, 2008 || Mount Lemmon || Mount Lemmon Survey || H || align=right data-sort-value="0.66" | 660 m || 
|-id=220 bgcolor=#E9E9E9
| 480220 ||  || — || October 7, 2008 || Kitt Peak || Spacewatch || MAR || align=right data-sort-value="0.94" | 940 m || 
|-id=221 bgcolor=#d6d6d6
| 480221 ||  || — || May 20, 2005 || Mount Lemmon || Mount Lemmon Survey || — || align=right | 2.3 km || 
|-id=222 bgcolor=#E9E9E9
| 480222 ||  || — || December 11, 2012 || Mount Lemmon || Mount Lemmon Survey || JUN || align=right | 1.0 km || 
|-id=223 bgcolor=#fefefe
| 480223 ||  || — || February 10, 2008 || Kitt Peak || Spacewatch || — || align=right data-sort-value="0.74" | 740 m || 
|-id=224 bgcolor=#fefefe
| 480224 ||  || — || September 28, 2006 || Kitt Peak || Spacewatch || — || align=right data-sort-value="0.79" | 790 m || 
|-id=225 bgcolor=#E9E9E9
| 480225 ||  || — || September 4, 1997 || Caussols || ODAS || — || align=right | 3.0 km || 
|-id=226 bgcolor=#fefefe
| 480226 ||  || — || January 10, 2008 || Kitt Peak || Spacewatch || — || align=right data-sort-value="0.82" | 820 m || 
|-id=227 bgcolor=#fefefe
| 480227 ||  || — || December 14, 2010 || Mount Lemmon || Mount Lemmon Survey || — || align=right data-sort-value="0.63" | 630 m || 
|-id=228 bgcolor=#E9E9E9
| 480228 ||  || — || April 6, 2011 || Mount Lemmon || Mount Lemmon Survey || — || align=right data-sort-value="0.99" | 990 m || 
|-id=229 bgcolor=#fefefe
| 480229 ||  || — || April 4, 2005 || Mount Lemmon || Mount Lemmon Survey || — || align=right data-sort-value="0.71" | 710 m || 
|-id=230 bgcolor=#E9E9E9
| 480230 ||  || — || December 11, 2004 || Kitt Peak || Spacewatch || — || align=right | 2.1 km || 
|-id=231 bgcolor=#fefefe
| 480231 ||  || — || April 5, 2008 || Mount Lemmon || Mount Lemmon Survey || — || align=right data-sort-value="0.67" | 670 m || 
|-id=232 bgcolor=#fefefe
| 480232 ||  || — || October 6, 1999 || Socorro || LINEAR || — || align=right data-sort-value="0.77" | 770 m || 
|-id=233 bgcolor=#fefefe
| 480233 ||  || — || January 10, 2007 || Mount Lemmon || Mount Lemmon Survey || — || align=right data-sort-value="0.92" | 920 m || 
|-id=234 bgcolor=#fefefe
| 480234 ||  || — || October 20, 2006 || Kitt Peak || Spacewatch || — || align=right data-sort-value="0.63" | 630 m || 
|-id=235 bgcolor=#E9E9E9
| 480235 ||  || — || February 9, 2010 || Mount Lemmon || Mount Lemmon Survey || — || align=right | 3.2 km || 
|-id=236 bgcolor=#E9E9E9
| 480236 ||  || — || April 8, 2003 || Kitt Peak || Spacewatch || — || align=right data-sort-value="0.88" | 880 m || 
|-id=237 bgcolor=#fefefe
| 480237 ||  || — || September 28, 2003 || Kitt Peak || Spacewatch || — || align=right data-sort-value="0.76" | 760 m || 
|-id=238 bgcolor=#E9E9E9
| 480238 ||  || — || December 31, 2013 || Mount Lemmon || Mount Lemmon Survey || — || align=right | 1.0 km || 
|-id=239 bgcolor=#fefefe
| 480239 ||  || — || August 30, 2005 || Kitt Peak || Spacewatch || — || align=right data-sort-value="0.96" | 960 m || 
|-id=240 bgcolor=#fefefe
| 480240 ||  || — || October 18, 2009 || Mount Lemmon || Mount Lemmon Survey || — || align=right data-sort-value="0.85" | 850 m || 
|-id=241 bgcolor=#d6d6d6
| 480241 ||  || — || January 2, 2009 || Kitt Peak || Spacewatch || KOR || align=right | 1.3 km || 
|-id=242 bgcolor=#fefefe
| 480242 ||  || — || October 23, 2009 || Kitt Peak || Spacewatch || — || align=right | 1.0 km || 
|-id=243 bgcolor=#fefefe
| 480243 ||  || — || December 25, 2013 || Mount Lemmon || Mount Lemmon Survey || (2076) || align=right | 1.0 km || 
|-id=244 bgcolor=#fefefe
| 480244 ||  || — || November 1, 1999 || Kitt Peak || Spacewatch || — || align=right data-sort-value="0.79" | 790 m || 
|-id=245 bgcolor=#E9E9E9
| 480245 ||  || — || May 21, 2011 || Mount Lemmon || Mount Lemmon Survey || — || align=right data-sort-value="0.89" | 890 m || 
|-id=246 bgcolor=#d6d6d6
| 480246 ||  || — || February 19, 2009 || Kitt Peak || Spacewatch || — || align=right | 2.4 km || 
|-id=247 bgcolor=#fefefe
| 480247 ||  || — || May 28, 2008 || Mount Lemmon || Mount Lemmon Survey || V || align=right data-sort-value="0.54" | 540 m || 
|-id=248 bgcolor=#d6d6d6
| 480248 ||  || — || March 7, 2014 || Mount Lemmon || Mount Lemmon Survey || — || align=right | 2.7 km || 
|-id=249 bgcolor=#E9E9E9
| 480249 ||  || — || April 13, 2011 || Mount Lemmon || Mount Lemmon Survey || — || align=right | 1.0 km || 
|-id=250 bgcolor=#fefefe
| 480250 ||  || — || February 17, 2007 || Mount Lemmon || Mount Lemmon Survey || — || align=right data-sort-value="0.89" | 890 m || 
|-id=251 bgcolor=#fefefe
| 480251 ||  || — || November 3, 2005 || Mount Lemmon || Mount Lemmon Survey || — || align=right data-sort-value="0.74" | 740 m || 
|-id=252 bgcolor=#d6d6d6
| 480252 ||  || — || March 11, 2005 || Kitt Peak || Spacewatch || BRA || align=right | 1.6 km || 
|-id=253 bgcolor=#fefefe
| 480253 ||  || — || September 21, 2003 || Kitt Peak || Spacewatch || — || align=right data-sort-value="0.83" | 830 m || 
|-id=254 bgcolor=#d6d6d6
| 480254 ||  || — || June 10, 2004 || Campo Imperatore || CINEOS || — || align=right | 3.3 km || 
|-id=255 bgcolor=#d6d6d6
| 480255 ||  || — || April 2, 2009 || Mount Lemmon || Mount Lemmon Survey || — || align=right | 2.6 km || 
|-id=256 bgcolor=#d6d6d6
| 480256 ||  || — || May 1, 2009 || Mount Lemmon || Mount Lemmon Survey || THB || align=right | 2.7 km || 
|-id=257 bgcolor=#E9E9E9
| 480257 ||  || — || August 14, 2007 || Siding Spring || SSS || — || align=right | 1.2 km || 
|-id=258 bgcolor=#fefefe
| 480258 ||  || — || March 29, 2004 || Kitt Peak || Spacewatch || — || align=right data-sort-value="0.78" | 780 m || 
|-id=259 bgcolor=#fefefe
| 480259 ||  || — || December 20, 2009 || Mount Lemmon || Mount Lemmon Survey || — || align=right | 1.0 km || 
|-id=260 bgcolor=#d6d6d6
| 480260 ||  || — || May 11, 2010 || Mount Lemmon || Mount Lemmon Survey || EOS || align=right | 1.5 km || 
|-id=261 bgcolor=#fefefe
| 480261 ||  || — || December 9, 2001 || Socorro || LINEAR || — || align=right | 1.9 km || 
|-id=262 bgcolor=#d6d6d6
| 480262 ||  || — || March 18, 2004 || Kitt Peak || Spacewatch || — || align=right | 2.5 km || 
|-id=263 bgcolor=#E9E9E9
| 480263 ||  || — || February 1, 2006 || Kitt Peak || Spacewatch || (5) || align=right data-sort-value="0.75" | 750 m || 
|-id=264 bgcolor=#E9E9E9
| 480264 ||  || — || October 20, 2008 || Mount Lemmon || Mount Lemmon Survey || — || align=right | 1.4 km || 
|-id=265 bgcolor=#E9E9E9
| 480265 ||  || — || October 11, 2004 || Kitt Peak || Spacewatch || — || align=right data-sort-value="0.73" | 730 m || 
|-id=266 bgcolor=#fefefe
| 480266 ||  || — || October 27, 2005 || Mount Lemmon || Mount Lemmon Survey || — || align=right data-sort-value="0.75" | 750 m || 
|-id=267 bgcolor=#E9E9E9
| 480267 ||  || — || September 30, 2003 || Kitt Peak || Spacewatch || MIS || align=right | 2.5 km || 
|-id=268 bgcolor=#E9E9E9
| 480268 ||  || — || October 31, 2007 || Mount Lemmon || Mount Lemmon Survey || DOR || align=right | 3.0 km || 
|-id=269 bgcolor=#fefefe
| 480269 ||  || — || May 3, 2008 || Kitt Peak || Spacewatch || V || align=right data-sort-value="0.42" | 420 m || 
|-id=270 bgcolor=#fefefe
| 480270 ||  || — || March 31, 2008 || Kitt Peak || Spacewatch || — || align=right data-sort-value="0.64" | 640 m || 
|-id=271 bgcolor=#fefefe
| 480271 ||  || — || November 18, 2006 || Kitt Peak || Spacewatch || — || align=right data-sort-value="0.79" | 790 m || 
|-id=272 bgcolor=#E9E9E9
| 480272 ||  || — || November 21, 2009 || Mount Lemmon || Mount Lemmon Survey || (5) || align=right data-sort-value="0.82" | 820 m || 
|-id=273 bgcolor=#fefefe
| 480273 ||  || — || June 12, 2005 || Mount Lemmon || Mount Lemmon Survey || — || align=right data-sort-value="0.63" | 630 m || 
|-id=274 bgcolor=#E9E9E9
| 480274 ||  || — || October 31, 1999 || Kitt Peak || Spacewatch || — || align=right | 1.2 km || 
|-id=275 bgcolor=#fefefe
| 480275 ||  || — || September 1, 2005 || Kitt Peak || Spacewatch || — || align=right data-sort-value="0.75" | 750 m || 
|-id=276 bgcolor=#fefefe
| 480276 ||  || — || June 4, 2005 || Kitt Peak || Spacewatch || — || align=right data-sort-value="0.72" | 720 m || 
|-id=277 bgcolor=#E9E9E9
| 480277 ||  || — || March 4, 2006 || Mount Lemmon || Mount Lemmon Survey || — || align=right | 1.4 km || 
|-id=278 bgcolor=#E9E9E9
| 480278 ||  || — || October 12, 2007 || Mount Lemmon || Mount Lemmon Survey || — || align=right | 2.0 km || 
|-id=279 bgcolor=#fefefe
| 480279 ||  || — || November 15, 1995 || Kitt Peak || Spacewatch || — || align=right data-sort-value="0.80" | 800 m || 
|-id=280 bgcolor=#fefefe
| 480280 ||  || — || September 17, 1998 || Kitt Peak || Spacewatch || V || align=right data-sort-value="0.63" | 630 m || 
|-id=281 bgcolor=#E9E9E9
| 480281 ||  || — || September 27, 2003 || Kitt Peak || Spacewatch || — || align=right | 1.4 km || 
|-id=282 bgcolor=#E9E9E9
| 480282 ||  || — || October 10, 2012 || Mount Lemmon || Mount Lemmon Survey || — || align=right | 1.5 km || 
|-id=283 bgcolor=#E9E9E9
| 480283 ||  || — || July 20, 2004 || Siding Spring || SSS || — || align=right | 1.2 km || 
|-id=284 bgcolor=#fefefe
| 480284 ||  || — || October 10, 1997 || Kitt Peak || Spacewatch || — || align=right data-sort-value="0.87" | 870 m || 
|-id=285 bgcolor=#E9E9E9
| 480285 ||  || — || October 1, 2000 || Socorro || LINEAR || — || align=right | 1.0 km || 
|-id=286 bgcolor=#fefefe
| 480286 ||  || — || August 22, 2004 || Kitt Peak || Spacewatch || V || align=right data-sort-value="0.56" | 560 m || 
|-id=287 bgcolor=#fefefe
| 480287 ||  || — || December 30, 2007 || Kitt Peak || Spacewatch || — || align=right data-sort-value="0.74" | 740 m || 
|-id=288 bgcolor=#fefefe
| 480288 ||  || — || August 21, 2006 || Kitt Peak || Spacewatch || — || align=right data-sort-value="0.69" | 690 m || 
|-id=289 bgcolor=#E9E9E9
| 480289 ||  || — || May 21, 2011 || Mount Lemmon || Mount Lemmon Survey || — || align=right data-sort-value="0.88" | 880 m || 
|-id=290 bgcolor=#E9E9E9
| 480290 ||  || — || April 20, 2007 || Mount Lemmon || Mount Lemmon Survey || — || align=right data-sort-value="0.79" | 790 m || 
|-id=291 bgcolor=#fefefe
| 480291 ||  || — || January 10, 2007 || Mount Lemmon || Mount Lemmon Survey || — || align=right data-sort-value="0.83" | 830 m || 
|-id=292 bgcolor=#fefefe
| 480292 ||  || — || August 24, 2008 || Kitt Peak || Spacewatch || — || align=right data-sort-value="0.85" | 850 m || 
|-id=293 bgcolor=#fefefe
| 480293 ||  || — || October 17, 1995 || Kitt Peak || Spacewatch || — || align=right data-sort-value="0.83" | 830 m || 
|-id=294 bgcolor=#fefefe
| 480294 ||  || — || September 20, 2009 || Kitt Peak || Spacewatch || V || align=right data-sort-value="0.50" | 500 m || 
|-id=295 bgcolor=#fefefe
| 480295 ||  || — || February 16, 2004 || Kitt Peak || Spacewatch || — || align=right data-sort-value="0.97" | 970 m || 
|-id=296 bgcolor=#d6d6d6
| 480296 ||  || — || April 20, 2009 || XuYi || PMO NEO || — || align=right | 4.5 km || 
|-id=297 bgcolor=#E9E9E9
| 480297 ||  || — || May 3, 2010 || WISE || WISE || — || align=right | 2.0 km || 
|-id=298 bgcolor=#fefefe
| 480298 ||  || — || January 24, 2007 || Kitt Peak || Spacewatch || — || align=right data-sort-value="0.76" | 760 m || 
|-id=299 bgcolor=#E9E9E9
| 480299 ||  || — || January 15, 1996 || Kitt Peak || Spacewatch || — || align=right | 1.9 km || 
|-id=300 bgcolor=#d6d6d6
| 480300 ||  || — || June 27, 2005 || Mount Lemmon || Mount Lemmon Survey || — || align=right | 2.4 km || 
|}

480301–480400 

|-bgcolor=#fefefe
| 480301 ||  || — || April 15, 2008 || Kitt Peak || Spacewatch || — || align=right data-sort-value="0.74" | 740 m || 
|-id=302 bgcolor=#fefefe
| 480302 ||  || — || November 17, 2001 || Socorro || LINEAR || — || align=right data-sort-value="0.97" | 970 m || 
|-id=303 bgcolor=#fefefe
| 480303 ||  || — || April 10, 2005 || Kitt Peak || Spacewatch || — || align=right data-sort-value="0.54" | 540 m || 
|-id=304 bgcolor=#E9E9E9
| 480304 ||  || — || September 13, 2007 || Catalina || CSS || — || align=right | 1.5 km || 
|-id=305 bgcolor=#E9E9E9
| 480305 ||  || — || November 14, 1995 || Kitt Peak || Spacewatch ||  || align=right | 1.8 km || 
|-id=306 bgcolor=#fefefe
| 480306 ||  || — || January 28, 2011 || Catalina || CSS || critical || align=right data-sort-value="0.94" | 940 m || 
|-id=307 bgcolor=#fefefe
| 480307 ||  || — || February 10, 2011 || Catalina || CSS || — || align=right | 1.2 km || 
|-id=308 bgcolor=#fefefe
| 480308 ||  || — || December 31, 2007 || Kitt Peak || Spacewatch || — || align=right data-sort-value="0.81" | 810 m || 
|-id=309 bgcolor=#E9E9E9
| 480309 ||  || — || September 11, 2007 || Kitt Peak || Spacewatch || — || align=right | 1.7 km || 
|-id=310 bgcolor=#d6d6d6
| 480310 ||  || — || April 17, 2005 || Kitt Peak || Spacewatch || — || align=right | 2.7 km || 
|-id=311 bgcolor=#fefefe
| 480311 ||  || — || May 13, 2004 || Kitt Peak || Spacewatch || — || align=right data-sort-value="0.79" | 790 m || 
|-id=312 bgcolor=#fefefe
| 480312 ||  || — || January 11, 2008 || Catalina || CSS || — || align=right data-sort-value="0.84" | 840 m || 
|-id=313 bgcolor=#fefefe
| 480313 ||  || — || August 30, 2005 || Kitt Peak || Spacewatch || — || align=right data-sort-value="0.86" | 860 m || 
|-id=314 bgcolor=#E9E9E9
| 480314 ||  || — || February 14, 2010 || Mount Lemmon || Mount Lemmon Survey || — || align=right | 1.5 km || 
|-id=315 bgcolor=#E9E9E9
| 480315 ||  || — || October 27, 2008 || Mount Lemmon || Mount Lemmon Survey || — || align=right | 1.6 km || 
|-id=316 bgcolor=#E9E9E9
| 480316 ||  || — || January 6, 2006 || Catalina || CSS || — || align=right | 2.9 km || 
|-id=317 bgcolor=#fefefe
| 480317 ||  || — || January 9, 2011 || Mount Lemmon || Mount Lemmon Survey || — || align=right | 1.0 km || 
|-id=318 bgcolor=#fefefe
| 480318 ||  || — || March 2, 2011 || Catalina || CSS || — || align=right | 1.0 km || 
|-id=319 bgcolor=#E9E9E9
| 480319 ||  || — || September 4, 2000 || Kitt Peak || Spacewatch || — || align=right | 1.2 km || 
|-id=320 bgcolor=#fefefe
| 480320 ||  || — || October 21, 2003 || Kitt Peak || Spacewatch || — || align=right data-sort-value="0.66" | 660 m || 
|-id=321 bgcolor=#E9E9E9
| 480321 ||  || — || September 7, 1996 || Kitt Peak || Spacewatch || — || align=right data-sort-value="0.93" | 930 m || 
|-id=322 bgcolor=#E9E9E9
| 480322 ||  || — || December 18, 2004 || Mount Lemmon || Mount Lemmon Survey || AGN || align=right | 1.3 km || 
|-id=323 bgcolor=#E9E9E9
| 480323 ||  || — || January 6, 2010 || Kitt Peak || Spacewatch || — || align=right | 1.5 km || 
|-id=324 bgcolor=#E9E9E9
| 480324 ||  || — || March 25, 2006 || Kitt Peak || Spacewatch || — || align=right | 2.6 km || 
|-id=325 bgcolor=#fefefe
| 480325 ||  || — || November 8, 2009 || Mount Lemmon || Mount Lemmon Survey || — || align=right data-sort-value="0.98" | 980 m || 
|-id=326 bgcolor=#fefefe
| 480326 ||  || — || November 17, 2009 || Mount Lemmon || Mount Lemmon Survey || — || align=right data-sort-value="0.86" | 860 m || 
|-id=327 bgcolor=#d6d6d6
| 480327 ||  || — || March 15, 2010 || WISE || WISE || — || align=right | 3.3 km || 
|-id=328 bgcolor=#fefefe
| 480328 ||  || — || September 22, 2009 || Kitt Peak || Spacewatch || V || align=right data-sort-value="0.70" | 700 m || 
|-id=329 bgcolor=#E9E9E9
| 480329 ||  || — || March 23, 2006 || Catalina || CSS || — || align=right | 1.7 km || 
|-id=330 bgcolor=#fefefe
| 480330 ||  || — || March 4, 2005 || Kitt Peak || Spacewatch || — || align=right data-sort-value="0.73" | 730 m || 
|-id=331 bgcolor=#fefefe
| 480331 ||  || — || February 25, 2007 || Mount Lemmon || Mount Lemmon Survey || — || align=right | 1.1 km || 
|-id=332 bgcolor=#E9E9E9
| 480332 ||  || — || June 28, 1995 || Kitt Peak || Spacewatch || EUN || align=right | 1.4 km || 
|-id=333 bgcolor=#d6d6d6
| 480333 ||  || — || September 15, 2006 || Kitt Peak || Spacewatch || — || align=right | 2.9 km || 
|-id=334 bgcolor=#fefefe
| 480334 ||  || — || September 11, 2005 || Kitt Peak || Spacewatch || V || align=right data-sort-value="0.62" | 620 m || 
|-id=335 bgcolor=#E9E9E9
| 480335 ||  || — || October 12, 2004 || Anderson Mesa || LONEOS || — || align=right | 1.3 km || 
|-id=336 bgcolor=#fefefe
| 480336 ||  || — || November 17, 1999 || Kitt Peak || Spacewatch || — || align=right | 1.2 km || 
|-id=337 bgcolor=#fefefe
| 480337 ||  || — || February 23, 2007 || Mount Lemmon || Mount Lemmon Survey || — || align=right data-sort-value="0.78" | 780 m || 
|-id=338 bgcolor=#E9E9E9
| 480338 ||  || — || October 8, 2004 || Kitt Peak || Spacewatch || — || align=right | 1.1 km || 
|-id=339 bgcolor=#fefefe
| 480339 ||  || — || January 28, 2014 || Mount Lemmon || Mount Lemmon Survey || — || align=right | 1.0 km || 
|-id=340 bgcolor=#E9E9E9
| 480340 ||  || — || January 2, 2009 || Mount Lemmon || Mount Lemmon Survey || ADE || align=right | 2.7 km || 
|-id=341 bgcolor=#E9E9E9
| 480341 ||  || — || November 3, 2004 || Kitt Peak || Spacewatch || — || align=right | 1.1 km || 
|-id=342 bgcolor=#d6d6d6
| 480342 ||  || — || March 6, 2014 || Mount Lemmon || Mount Lemmon Survey || EOS || align=right | 1.7 km || 
|-id=343 bgcolor=#E9E9E9
| 480343 ||  || — || April 15, 2010 || Mount Lemmon || Mount Lemmon Survey || — || align=right | 2.0 km || 
|-id=344 bgcolor=#E9E9E9
| 480344 ||  || — || February 24, 2006 || Mount Lemmon || Mount Lemmon Survey || — || align=right | 1.0 km || 
|-id=345 bgcolor=#E9E9E9
| 480345 ||  || — || January 1, 2009 || Kitt Peak || Spacewatch || ADE || align=right | 1.9 km || 
|-id=346 bgcolor=#E9E9E9
| 480346 ||  || — || May 29, 2011 || Mount Lemmon || Mount Lemmon Survey || — || align=right data-sort-value="0.89" | 890 m || 
|-id=347 bgcolor=#E9E9E9
| 480347 ||  || — || April 2, 2011 || Mount Lemmon || Mount Lemmon Survey || — || align=right | 1.2 km || 
|-id=348 bgcolor=#d6d6d6
| 480348 ||  || — || January 5, 2013 || Mount Lemmon || Mount Lemmon Survey || — || align=right | 3.4 km || 
|-id=349 bgcolor=#d6d6d6
| 480349 ||  || — || January 28, 2007 || Mount Lemmon || Mount Lemmon Survey || 7:4 || align=right | 3.4 km || 
|-id=350 bgcolor=#d6d6d6
| 480350 ||  || — || May 28, 2004 || Kitt Peak || Spacewatch || — || align=right | 2.7 km || 
|-id=351 bgcolor=#d6d6d6
| 480351 ||  || — || April 22, 2010 || WISE || WISE || — || align=right | 4.9 km || 
|-id=352 bgcolor=#d6d6d6
| 480352 ||  || — || February 27, 2009 || Kitt Peak || Spacewatch || EOS || align=right | 1.4 km || 
|-id=353 bgcolor=#E9E9E9
| 480353 ||  || — || May 24, 2011 || Mount Lemmon || Mount Lemmon Survey || — || align=right | 1.2 km || 
|-id=354 bgcolor=#fefefe
| 480354 ||  || — || November 16, 2009 || Kitt Peak || Spacewatch || — || align=right data-sort-value="0.94" | 940 m || 
|-id=355 bgcolor=#fefefe
| 480355 ||  || — || February 7, 2008 || Mount Lemmon || Mount Lemmon Survey || — || align=right data-sort-value="0.75" | 750 m || 
|-id=356 bgcolor=#E9E9E9
| 480356 ||  || — || November 30, 2008 || Kitt Peak || Spacewatch || — || align=right | 1.1 km || 
|-id=357 bgcolor=#E9E9E9
| 480357 ||  || — || April 8, 2006 || Kitt Peak || Spacewatch || — || align=right | 1.2 km || 
|-id=358 bgcolor=#E9E9E9
| 480358 ||  || — || November 4, 2004 || Kitt Peak || Spacewatch || — || align=right data-sort-value="0.90" | 900 m || 
|-id=359 bgcolor=#d6d6d6
| 480359 ||  || — || September 2, 2010 || Mount Lemmon || Mount Lemmon Survey || — || align=right | 3.2 km || 
|-id=360 bgcolor=#fefefe
| 480360 ||  || — || January 16, 2004 || Kitt Peak || Spacewatch || — || align=right data-sort-value="0.60" | 600 m || 
|-id=361 bgcolor=#fefefe
| 480361 ||  || — || November 12, 2005 || Kitt Peak || Spacewatch || — || align=right data-sort-value="0.98" | 980 m || 
|-id=362 bgcolor=#d6d6d6
| 480362 ||  || — || April 12, 2010 || WISE || WISE || — || align=right | 2.9 km || 
|-id=363 bgcolor=#d6d6d6
| 480363 ||  || — || October 30, 2007 || Mount Lemmon || Mount Lemmon Survey || — || align=right | 2.1 km || 
|-id=364 bgcolor=#fefefe
| 480364 ||  || — || December 8, 2010 || Mount Lemmon || Mount Lemmon Survey || — || align=right data-sort-value="0.82" | 820 m || 
|-id=365 bgcolor=#fefefe
| 480365 ||  || — || December 30, 2007 || Kitt Peak || Spacewatch || — || align=right data-sort-value="0.68" | 680 m || 
|-id=366 bgcolor=#E9E9E9
| 480366 ||  || — || March 13, 2010 || Catalina || CSS || — || align=right | 2.3 km || 
|-id=367 bgcolor=#fefefe
| 480367 ||  || — || December 22, 2003 || Socorro || LINEAR || — || align=right data-sort-value="0.82" | 820 m || 
|-id=368 bgcolor=#E9E9E9
| 480368 ||  || — || March 20, 2010 || Kitt Peak || Spacewatch || HOF || align=right | 2.2 km || 
|-id=369 bgcolor=#fefefe
| 480369 ||  || — || December 16, 2007 || Mount Lemmon || Mount Lemmon Survey || — || align=right data-sort-value="0.51" | 510 m || 
|-id=370 bgcolor=#fefefe
| 480370 ||  || — || December 25, 2013 || Mount Lemmon || Mount Lemmon Survey || — || align=right data-sort-value="0.69" | 690 m || 
|-id=371 bgcolor=#E9E9E9
| 480371 ||  || — || October 20, 2008 || Mount Lemmon || Mount Lemmon Survey || — || align=right data-sort-value="0.86" | 860 m || 
|-id=372 bgcolor=#d6d6d6
| 480372 ||  || — || June 20, 2004 || Kitt Peak || Spacewatch || — || align=right | 3.5 km || 
|-id=373 bgcolor=#E9E9E9
| 480373 ||  || — || May 19, 2010 || Mount Lemmon || Mount Lemmon Survey || — || align=right | 2.8 km || 
|-id=374 bgcolor=#E9E9E9
| 480374 ||  || — || August 11, 2007 || Siding Spring || SSS || — || align=right | 1.7 km || 
|-id=375 bgcolor=#E9E9E9
| 480375 ||  || — || October 29, 2003 || Kitt Peak || Spacewatch || — || align=right | 2.2 km || 
|-id=376 bgcolor=#fefefe
| 480376 ||  || — || March 10, 2008 || Mount Lemmon || Mount Lemmon Survey || — || align=right data-sort-value="0.74" | 740 m || 
|-id=377 bgcolor=#E9E9E9
| 480377 ||  || — || January 30, 2000 || Kitt Peak || Spacewatch || — || align=right | 2.0 km || 
|-id=378 bgcolor=#d6d6d6
| 480378 ||  || — || January 18, 2008 || Mount Lemmon || Mount Lemmon Survey || — || align=right | 3.2 km || 
|-id=379 bgcolor=#E9E9E9
| 480379 ||  || — || November 8, 2008 || Kitt Peak || Spacewatch || — || align=right data-sort-value="0.81" | 810 m || 
|-id=380 bgcolor=#E9E9E9
| 480380 ||  || — || June 4, 2011 || Mount Lemmon || Mount Lemmon Survey || — || align=right data-sort-value="0.77" | 770 m || 
|-id=381 bgcolor=#E9E9E9
| 480381 ||  || — || December 4, 2012 || Mount Lemmon || Mount Lemmon Survey || — || align=right | 1.5 km || 
|-id=382 bgcolor=#E9E9E9
| 480382 ||  || — || October 15, 2004 || Kitt Peak || Spacewatch || — || align=right | 1.4 km || 
|-id=383 bgcolor=#d6d6d6
| 480383 ||  || — || April 12, 2010 || WISE || WISE || EOS || align=right | 1.6 km || 
|-id=384 bgcolor=#fefefe
| 480384 ||  || — || May 9, 2005 || Mount Lemmon || Mount Lemmon Survey || — || align=right data-sort-value="0.55" | 550 m || 
|-id=385 bgcolor=#fefefe
| 480385 ||  || — || March 10, 2011 || Mount Lemmon || Mount Lemmon Survey || — || align=right data-sort-value="0.96" | 960 m || 
|-id=386 bgcolor=#E9E9E9
| 480386 ||  || — || December 21, 2003 || Kitt Peak || Spacewatch || EUN || align=right | 1.1 km || 
|-id=387 bgcolor=#E9E9E9
| 480387 ||  || — || June 4, 2010 || WISE || WISE || — || align=right | 3.1 km || 
|-id=388 bgcolor=#d6d6d6
| 480388 ||  || — || November 23, 2006 || Kitt Peak || Spacewatch || — || align=right | 2.7 km || 
|-id=389 bgcolor=#E9E9E9
| 480389 ||  || — || October 9, 1999 || Kitt Peak || Spacewatch || — || align=right | 1.5 km || 
|-id=390 bgcolor=#fefefe
| 480390 ||  || — || March 5, 1997 || Kitt Peak || Spacewatch || — || align=right data-sort-value="0.91" | 910 m || 
|-id=391 bgcolor=#d6d6d6
| 480391 ||  || — || March 29, 2006 || Kitt Peak || Spacewatch || 3:2 || align=right | 7.0 km || 
|-id=392 bgcolor=#E9E9E9
| 480392 ||  || — || October 11, 2007 || Kitt Peak || Spacewatch || — || align=right | 2.0 km || 
|-id=393 bgcolor=#E9E9E9
| 480393 ||  || — || November 18, 2008 || Kitt Peak || Spacewatch || BRG || align=right | 1.8 km || 
|-id=394 bgcolor=#E9E9E9
| 480394 ||  || — || October 3, 2003 || Kitt Peak || Spacewatch || EUN || align=right | 1.3 km || 
|-id=395 bgcolor=#E9E9E9
| 480395 ||  || — || September 22, 2003 || Kitt Peak || Spacewatch || — || align=right | 2.8 km || 
|-id=396 bgcolor=#E9E9E9
| 480396 ||  || — || December 5, 2008 || Kitt Peak || Spacewatch || — || align=right | 1.5 km || 
|-id=397 bgcolor=#E9E9E9
| 480397 ||  || — || February 1, 2006 || Mount Lemmon || Mount Lemmon Survey || — || align=right data-sort-value="0.94" | 940 m || 
|-id=398 bgcolor=#E9E9E9
| 480398 ||  || — || January 23, 2006 || Kitt Peak || Spacewatch || — || align=right | 1.3 km || 
|-id=399 bgcolor=#d6d6d6
| 480399 ||  || — || May 15, 2010 || WISE || WISE || — || align=right | 2.4 km || 
|-id=400 bgcolor=#E9E9E9
| 480400 ||  || — || May 23, 2011 || Mount Lemmon || Mount Lemmon Survey || — || align=right data-sort-value="0.94" | 940 m || 
|}

480401–480500 

|-bgcolor=#fefefe
| 480401 ||  || — || April 6, 2011 || Mount Lemmon || Mount Lemmon Survey || V || align=right data-sort-value="0.59" | 590 m || 
|-id=402 bgcolor=#E9E9E9
| 480402 ||  || — || March 26, 2001 || Kitt Peak || Spacewatch || — || align=right | 2.3 km || 
|-id=403 bgcolor=#E9E9E9
| 480403 ||  || — || September 24, 2008 || Kitt Peak || Spacewatch || KRM || align=right | 1.7 km || 
|-id=404 bgcolor=#E9E9E9
| 480404 ||  || — || June 21, 2007 || Mount Lemmon || Mount Lemmon Survey || — || align=right | 1.3 km || 
|-id=405 bgcolor=#E9E9E9
| 480405 ||  || — || December 30, 2013 || Mount Lemmon || Mount Lemmon Survey || — || align=right | 1.8 km || 
|-id=406 bgcolor=#d6d6d6
| 480406 ||  || — || July 26, 2010 || WISE || WISE || — || align=right | 2.5 km || 
|-id=407 bgcolor=#E9E9E9
| 480407 ||  || — || May 14, 2010 || WISE || WISE || — || align=right | 1.7 km || 
|-id=408 bgcolor=#E9E9E9
| 480408 ||  || — || May 1, 2003 || Kitt Peak || Spacewatch || — || align=right | 1.0 km || 
|-id=409 bgcolor=#E9E9E9
| 480409 ||  || — || August 24, 2007 || Kitt Peak || Spacewatch || — || align=right | 1.3 km || 
|-id=410 bgcolor=#d6d6d6
| 480410 ||  || — || October 27, 2011 || Mount Lemmon || Mount Lemmon Survey || — || align=right | 2.9 km || 
|-id=411 bgcolor=#fefefe
| 480411 ||  || — || November 17, 2009 || Mount Lemmon || Mount Lemmon Survey || — || align=right data-sort-value="0.71" | 710 m || 
|-id=412 bgcolor=#fefefe
| 480412 ||  || — || November 18, 2001 || Socorro || LINEAR || V || align=right data-sort-value="0.84" | 840 m || 
|-id=413 bgcolor=#E9E9E9
| 480413 ||  || — || December 28, 2013 || Kitt Peak || Spacewatch || — || align=right | 2.3 km || 
|-id=414 bgcolor=#E9E9E9
| 480414 ||  || — || October 6, 2008 || Mount Lemmon || Mount Lemmon Survey || — || align=right | 1.3 km || 
|-id=415 bgcolor=#d6d6d6
| 480415 ||  || — || December 31, 2007 || Mount Lemmon || Mount Lemmon Survey || — || align=right | 2.9 km || 
|-id=416 bgcolor=#E9E9E9
| 480416 ||  || — || November 6, 2012 || Kitt Peak || Spacewatch || EUN || align=right | 1.2 km || 
|-id=417 bgcolor=#d6d6d6
| 480417 ||  || — || January 4, 2013 || Mount Lemmon || Mount Lemmon Survey || — || align=right | 2.6 km || 
|-id=418 bgcolor=#fefefe
| 480418 ||  || — || October 27, 2009 || Mount Lemmon || Mount Lemmon Survey || — || align=right | 1.0 km || 
|-id=419 bgcolor=#E9E9E9
| 480419 ||  || — || September 23, 2008 || Mount Lemmon || Mount Lemmon Survey || — || align=right data-sort-value="0.93" | 930 m || 
|-id=420 bgcolor=#E9E9E9
| 480420 ||  || — || September 10, 2007 || Kitt Peak || Spacewatch || — || align=right | 2.5 km || 
|-id=421 bgcolor=#fefefe
| 480421 ||  || — || September 30, 2005 || Kitt Peak || Spacewatch || — || align=right | 1.0 km || 
|-id=422 bgcolor=#E9E9E9
| 480422 ||  || — || October 20, 2008 || Kitt Peak || Spacewatch || — || align=right | 1.1 km || 
|-id=423 bgcolor=#d6d6d6
| 480423 ||  || — || April 19, 2009 || Mount Lemmon || Mount Lemmon Survey || — || align=right | 2.9 km || 
|-id=424 bgcolor=#d6d6d6
| 480424 ||  || — || November 12, 2006 || Mount Lemmon || Mount Lemmon Survey || EOS || align=right | 1.8 km || 
|-id=425 bgcolor=#E9E9E9
| 480425 ||  || — || January 14, 2010 || WISE || WISE || — || align=right | 2.0 km || 
|-id=426 bgcolor=#E9E9E9
| 480426 ||  || — || March 28, 2011 || Catalina || CSS || — || align=right | 1.9 km || 
|-id=427 bgcolor=#d6d6d6
| 480427 ||  || — || November 2, 2007 || Kitt Peak || Spacewatch || KOR || align=right | 1.4 km || 
|-id=428 bgcolor=#E9E9E9
| 480428 ||  || — || December 18, 2004 || Mount Lemmon || Mount Lemmon Survey || — || align=right | 2.2 km || 
|-id=429 bgcolor=#E9E9E9
| 480429 ||  || — || June 3, 2011 || Mount Lemmon || Mount Lemmon Survey || — || align=right | 1.7 km || 
|-id=430 bgcolor=#E9E9E9
| 480430 ||  || — || September 22, 2003 || Kitt Peak || Spacewatch || — || align=right | 1.8 km || 
|-id=431 bgcolor=#d6d6d6
| 480431 ||  || — || November 2, 2007 || Kitt Peak || Spacewatch || — || align=right | 2.3 km || 
|-id=432 bgcolor=#fefefe
| 480432 ||  || — || January 28, 2011 || Kitt Peak || Spacewatch || — || align=right data-sort-value="0.73" | 730 m || 
|-id=433 bgcolor=#E9E9E9
| 480433 ||  || — || September 19, 2003 || Kitt Peak || Spacewatch || EUN || align=right data-sort-value="0.96" | 960 m || 
|-id=434 bgcolor=#d6d6d6
| 480434 ||  || — || October 2, 2006 || Mount Lemmon || Mount Lemmon Survey || — || align=right | 2.6 km || 
|-id=435 bgcolor=#fefefe
| 480435 ||  || — || June 8, 2008 || Kitt Peak || Spacewatch || — || align=right data-sort-value="0.90" | 900 m || 
|-id=436 bgcolor=#E9E9E9
| 480436 ||  || — || December 15, 2007 || Kitt Peak || Spacewatch || — || align=right | 2.5 km || 
|-id=437 bgcolor=#fefefe
| 480437 ||  || — || November 16, 2009 || Mount Lemmon || Mount Lemmon Survey || V || align=right data-sort-value="0.72" | 720 m || 
|-id=438 bgcolor=#d6d6d6
| 480438 ||  || — || November 29, 2005 || Kitt Peak || Spacewatch || Tj (2.99) || align=right | 4.6 km || 
|-id=439 bgcolor=#E9E9E9
| 480439 ||  || — || January 17, 2011 || Mount Lemmon || Mount Lemmon Survey || — || align=right | 1.3 km || 
|-id=440 bgcolor=#d6d6d6
| 480440 ||  || — || April 19, 2004 || Kitt Peak || Spacewatch || — || align=right | 2.3 km || 
|-id=441 bgcolor=#E9E9E9
| 480441 ||  || — || October 2, 2003 || Kitt Peak || Spacewatch || — || align=right | 1.5 km || 
|-id=442 bgcolor=#d6d6d6
| 480442 ||  || — || February 1, 2010 || WISE || WISE || — || align=right | 4.2 km || 
|-id=443 bgcolor=#fefefe
| 480443 ||  || — || March 5, 2008 || Mount Lemmon || Mount Lemmon Survey || — || align=right data-sort-value="0.59" | 590 m || 
|-id=444 bgcolor=#d6d6d6
| 480444 ||  || — || November 9, 2007 || Kitt Peak || Spacewatch || — || align=right | 2.5 km || 
|-id=445 bgcolor=#fefefe
| 480445 ||  || — || January 29, 2007 || Kitt Peak || Spacewatch || — || align=right data-sort-value="0.78" | 780 m || 
|-id=446 bgcolor=#d6d6d6
| 480446 ||  || — || October 25, 2005 || Mount Lemmon || Mount Lemmon Survey || Tj (2.98) || align=right | 4.3 km || 
|-id=447 bgcolor=#fefefe
| 480447 ||  || — || November 7, 2013 || Kitt Peak || Spacewatch || — || align=right data-sort-value="0.66" | 660 m || 
|-id=448 bgcolor=#E9E9E9
| 480448 ||  || — || October 1, 2008 || Mount Lemmon || Mount Lemmon Survey || — || align=right | 1.3 km || 
|-id=449 bgcolor=#E9E9E9
| 480449 ||  || — || November 16, 1995 || Kitt Peak || Spacewatch || — || align=right | 1.4 km || 
|-id=450 bgcolor=#d6d6d6
| 480450 ||  || — || January 10, 2008 || Mount Lemmon || Mount Lemmon Survey || Tj (2.99) || align=right | 3.1 km || 
|-id=451 bgcolor=#E9E9E9
| 480451 ||  || — || June 3, 2010 || WISE || WISE || — || align=right | 2.2 km || 
|-id=452 bgcolor=#E9E9E9
| 480452 ||  || — || October 11, 2007 || Kitt Peak || Spacewatch || — || align=right | 2.2 km || 
|-id=453 bgcolor=#d6d6d6
| 480453 ||  || — || May 27, 2010 || WISE || WISE || — || align=right | 3.3 km || 
|-id=454 bgcolor=#d6d6d6
| 480454 ||  || — || June 11, 2004 || Kitt Peak || Spacewatch || — || align=right | 3.7 km || 
|-id=455 bgcolor=#E9E9E9
| 480455 ||  || — || February 2, 2006 || Kitt Peak || Spacewatch || — || align=right | 1.3 km || 
|-id=456 bgcolor=#E9E9E9
| 480456 ||  || — || August 10, 2007 || Kitt Peak || Spacewatch || — || align=right | 1.4 km || 
|-id=457 bgcolor=#E9E9E9
| 480457 ||  || — || May 31, 2003 || Kitt Peak || Spacewatch || EUN || align=right data-sort-value="0.99" | 990 m || 
|-id=458 bgcolor=#E9E9E9
| 480458 ||  || — || May 20, 2006 || Kitt Peak || Spacewatch || — || align=right | 1.6 km || 
|-id=459 bgcolor=#d6d6d6
| 480459 ||  || — || May 21, 2010 || WISE || WISE || Tj (2.98) || align=right | 3.0 km || 
|-id=460 bgcolor=#E9E9E9
| 480460 ||  || — || March 25, 2006 || Mount Lemmon || Mount Lemmon Survey || — || align=right | 1.7 km || 
|-id=461 bgcolor=#E9E9E9
| 480461 ||  || — || January 27, 2006 || Mount Lemmon || Mount Lemmon Survey || — || align=right | 3.4 km || 
|-id=462 bgcolor=#d6d6d6
| 480462 ||  || — || October 1, 2005 || Kitt Peak || Spacewatch || — || align=right | 3.6 km || 
|-id=463 bgcolor=#d6d6d6
| 480463 ||  || — || December 5, 2007 || Mount Lemmon || Mount Lemmon Survey ||  || align=right | 3.2 km || 
|-id=464 bgcolor=#d6d6d6
| 480464 ||  || — || March 31, 2009 || Catalina || CSS || — || align=right | 2.9 km || 
|-id=465 bgcolor=#d6d6d6
| 480465 ||  || — || February 26, 2014 || Kitt Peak || Spacewatch || EOS || align=right | 1.8 km || 
|-id=466 bgcolor=#E9E9E9
| 480466 ||  || — || September 21, 2003 || Kitt Peak || Spacewatch || MAR || align=right data-sort-value="0.92" | 920 m || 
|-id=467 bgcolor=#d6d6d6
| 480467 ||  || — || May 15, 2010 || WISE || WISE || — || align=right | 3.3 km || 
|-id=468 bgcolor=#E9E9E9
| 480468 ||  || — || March 18, 2010 || Kitt Peak || Spacewatch || — || align=right | 1.3 km || 
|-id=469 bgcolor=#E9E9E9
| 480469 ||  || — || May 22, 2011 || Mount Lemmon || Mount Lemmon Survey || — || align=right | 1.2 km || 
|-id=470 bgcolor=#fefefe
| 480470 ||  || — || April 24, 2011 || Mount Lemmon || Mount Lemmon Survey || — || align=right data-sort-value="0.78" | 780 m || 
|-id=471 bgcolor=#fefefe
| 480471 ||  || — || August 14, 2012 || Kitt Peak || Spacewatch || (2076) || align=right data-sort-value="0.82" | 820 m || 
|-id=472 bgcolor=#E9E9E9
| 480472 ||  || — || November 19, 2008 || Kitt Peak || Spacewatch || — || align=right | 1.2 km || 
|-id=473 bgcolor=#d6d6d6
| 480473 ||  || — || November 18, 2011 || Kitt Peak || Spacewatch || — || align=right | 3.3 km || 
|-id=474 bgcolor=#d6d6d6
| 480474 ||  || — || October 26, 2005 || Kitt Peak || Spacewatch || — || align=right | 2.9 km || 
|-id=475 bgcolor=#d6d6d6
| 480475 ||  || — || April 26, 2010 || WISE || WISE || — || align=right | 2.4 km || 
|-id=476 bgcolor=#fefefe
| 480476 ||  || — || May 10, 2004 || Campo Imperatore || CINEOS || V || align=right data-sort-value="0.83" | 830 m || 
|-id=477 bgcolor=#E9E9E9
| 480477 ||  || — || November 3, 2008 || Catalina || CSS || — || align=right | 1.6 km || 
|-id=478 bgcolor=#d6d6d6
| 480478 ||  || — || May 13, 2010 || Mount Lemmon || Mount Lemmon Survey || — || align=right | 2.9 km || 
|-id=479 bgcolor=#fefefe
| 480479 ||  || — || February 7, 2008 || Mount Lemmon || Mount Lemmon Survey || — || align=right data-sort-value="0.90" | 900 m || 
|-id=480 bgcolor=#fefefe
| 480480 ||  || — || October 28, 2005 || Mount Lemmon || Mount Lemmon Survey || — || align=right | 1.0 km || 
|-id=481 bgcolor=#d6d6d6
| 480481 ||  || — || April 17, 2009 || Kitt Peak || Spacewatch || — || align=right | 4.1 km || 
|-id=482 bgcolor=#d6d6d6
| 480482 ||  || — || March 25, 2014 || Mount Lemmon || Mount Lemmon Survey || — || align=right | 3.3 km || 
|-id=483 bgcolor=#fefefe
| 480483 ||  || — || January 17, 2007 || Kitt Peak || Spacewatch || — || align=right data-sort-value="0.73" | 730 m || 
|-id=484 bgcolor=#d6d6d6
| 480484 ||  || — || September 26, 2006 || Kitt Peak || Spacewatch || — || align=right | 2.3 km || 
|-id=485 bgcolor=#E9E9E9
| 480485 ||  || — || February 26, 2009 || Kitt Peak || Spacewatch || NEM || align=right | 2.2 km || 
|-id=486 bgcolor=#d6d6d6
| 480486 ||  || — || December 13, 2006 || Kitt Peak || Spacewatch || — || align=right | 3.4 km || 
|-id=487 bgcolor=#E9E9E9
| 480487 ||  || — || October 12, 2007 || Mount Lemmon || Mount Lemmon Survey || HOF || align=right | 2.7 km || 
|-id=488 bgcolor=#d6d6d6
| 480488 ||  || — || November 1, 2006 || Mount Lemmon || Mount Lemmon Survey || — || align=right | 3.8 km || 
|-id=489 bgcolor=#E9E9E9
| 480489 ||  || — || January 20, 2009 || Kitt Peak || Spacewatch || — || align=right | 2.3 km || 
|-id=490 bgcolor=#d6d6d6
| 480490 ||  || — || September 11, 2010 || Mount Lemmon || Mount Lemmon Survey || — || align=right | 3.5 km || 
|-id=491 bgcolor=#d6d6d6
| 480491 ||  || — || January 5, 2013 || Mount Lemmon || Mount Lemmon Survey || — || align=right | 3.5 km || 
|-id=492 bgcolor=#fefefe
| 480492 ||  || — || October 8, 2012 || Catalina || CSS || — || align=right | 1.0 km || 
|-id=493 bgcolor=#d6d6d6
| 480493 ||  || — || September 4, 2010 || Mount Lemmon || Mount Lemmon Survey || — || align=right | 2.7 km || 
|-id=494 bgcolor=#fefefe
| 480494 ||  || — || April 19, 2007 || Mount Lemmon || Mount Lemmon Survey || MAS || align=right data-sort-value="0.90" | 900 m || 
|-id=495 bgcolor=#E9E9E9
| 480495 ||  || — || July 1, 2011 || Mount Lemmon || Mount Lemmon Survey || — || align=right | 1.00 km || 
|-id=496 bgcolor=#d6d6d6
| 480496 ||  || — || December 17, 2007 || Kitt Peak || Spacewatch || — || align=right | 2.5 km || 
|-id=497 bgcolor=#d6d6d6
| 480497 ||  || — || January 10, 2007 || Kitt Peak || Spacewatch || — || align=right | 4.0 km || 
|-id=498 bgcolor=#E9E9E9
| 480498 ||  || — || April 10, 2010 || Mount Lemmon || Mount Lemmon Survey || — || align=right | 1.7 km || 
|-id=499 bgcolor=#E9E9E9
| 480499 ||  || — || October 30, 2007 || Mount Lemmon || Mount Lemmon Survey || — || align=right | 1.8 km || 
|-id=500 bgcolor=#E9E9E9
| 480500 ||  || — || December 17, 2009 || Kitt Peak || Spacewatch || — || align=right | 1.8 km || 
|}

480501–480600 

|-bgcolor=#E9E9E9
| 480501 ||  || — || November 4, 1999 || Kitt Peak || Spacewatch || — || align=right | 1.5 km || 
|-id=502 bgcolor=#fefefe
| 480502 ||  || — || October 22, 2005 || Kitt Peak || Spacewatch || — || align=right data-sort-value="0.95" | 950 m || 
|-id=503 bgcolor=#E9E9E9
| 480503 ||  || — || October 21, 2003 || Kitt Peak || Spacewatch || — || align=right | 1.2 km || 
|-id=504 bgcolor=#E9E9E9
| 480504 ||  || — || August 24, 2011 || Siding Spring || SSS || — || align=right | 1.4 km || 
|-id=505 bgcolor=#fefefe
| 480505 ||  || — || March 15, 2008 || Mount Lemmon || Mount Lemmon Survey || — || align=right | 1.00 km || 
|-id=506 bgcolor=#d6d6d6
| 480506 ||  || — || May 21, 2010 || WISE || WISE || — || align=right | 4.0 km || 
|-id=507 bgcolor=#d6d6d6
| 480507 ||  || — || November 4, 2007 || Mount Lemmon || Mount Lemmon Survey || — || align=right | 3.6 km || 
|-id=508 bgcolor=#d6d6d6
| 480508 ||  || — || September 15, 2007 || Mount Lemmon || Mount Lemmon Survey || 615 || align=right | 1.6 km || 
|-id=509 bgcolor=#d6d6d6
| 480509 ||  || — || May 13, 2004 || Anderson Mesa || LONEOS || — || align=right | 3.2 km || 
|-id=510 bgcolor=#fefefe
| 480510 ||  || — || August 31, 2005 || Kitt Peak || Spacewatch || — || align=right data-sort-value="0.77" | 770 m || 
|-id=511 bgcolor=#d6d6d6
| 480511 ||  || — || September 17, 2010 || Kitt Peak || Spacewatch || — || align=right | 2.8 km || 
|-id=512 bgcolor=#E9E9E9
| 480512 ||  || — || April 13, 2005 || Kitt Peak || Spacewatch || — || align=right | 2.5 km || 
|-id=513 bgcolor=#fefefe
| 480513 ||  || — || April 5, 2003 || Kitt Peak || Spacewatch || — || align=right data-sort-value="0.81" | 810 m || 
|-id=514 bgcolor=#d6d6d6
| 480514 ||  || — || June 28, 2010 || WISE || WISE || LIX || align=right | 3.1 km || 
|-id=515 bgcolor=#E9E9E9
| 480515 ||  || — || February 14, 2010 || Kitt Peak || Spacewatch || — || align=right | 1.1 km || 
|-id=516 bgcolor=#d6d6d6
| 480516 ||  || — || December 22, 2006 || Kitt Peak || Spacewatch || — || align=right | 3.8 km || 
|-id=517 bgcolor=#d6d6d6
| 480517 ||  || — || December 15, 2001 || Socorro || LINEAR || — || align=right | 2.8 km || 
|-id=518 bgcolor=#d6d6d6
| 480518 ||  || — || January 3, 2013 || Mount Lemmon || Mount Lemmon Survey || EOS || align=right | 1.7 km || 
|-id=519 bgcolor=#E9E9E9
| 480519 ||  || — || September 22, 2011 || Kitt Peak || Spacewatch || — || align=right | 1.9 km || 
|-id=520 bgcolor=#d6d6d6
| 480520 ||  || — || November 17, 2006 || Kitt Peak || Spacewatch || — || align=right | 2.3 km || 
|-id=521 bgcolor=#d6d6d6
| 480521 ||  || — || June 18, 2010 || WISE || WISE || — || align=right | 2.9 km || 
|-id=522 bgcolor=#E9E9E9
| 480522 ||  || — || September 26, 2011 || Mount Lemmon || Mount Lemmon Survey || — || align=right | 1.9 km || 
|-id=523 bgcolor=#E9E9E9
| 480523 ||  || — || October 20, 2003 || Kitt Peak || Spacewatch || — || align=right | 1.5 km || 
|-id=524 bgcolor=#E9E9E9
| 480524 ||  || — || April 2, 2002 || Kitt Peak || Spacewatch || — || align=right | 1.9 km || 
|-id=525 bgcolor=#d6d6d6
| 480525 ||  || — || June 14, 2004 || Kitt Peak || Spacewatch || — || align=right | 2.9 km || 
|-id=526 bgcolor=#d6d6d6
| 480526 ||  || — || October 9, 2005 || Kitt Peak || Spacewatch || EOS || align=right | 1.9 km || 
|-id=527 bgcolor=#d6d6d6
| 480527 ||  || — || July 8, 2010 || WISE || WISE || — || align=right | 2.8 km || 
|-id=528 bgcolor=#d6d6d6
| 480528 ||  || — || June 25, 2010 || WISE || WISE || Tj (2.99) || align=right | 4.6 km || 
|-id=529 bgcolor=#E9E9E9
| 480529 ||  || — || November 4, 2007 || Kitt Peak || Spacewatch || — || align=right | 2.8 km || 
|-id=530 bgcolor=#d6d6d6
| 480530 ||  || — || March 5, 2008 || Mount Lemmon || Mount Lemmon Survey || — || align=right | 2.7 km || 
|-id=531 bgcolor=#E9E9E9
| 480531 ||  || — || October 11, 2007 || Mount Lemmon || Mount Lemmon Survey || — || align=right | 1.9 km || 
|-id=532 bgcolor=#E9E9E9
| 480532 ||  || — || October 25, 2003 || Kitt Peak || Spacewatch || — || align=right | 1.6 km || 
|-id=533 bgcolor=#fefefe
| 480533 ||  || — || March 8, 2005 || Kitt Peak || Spacewatch || — || align=right data-sort-value="0.68" | 680 m || 
|-id=534 bgcolor=#d6d6d6
| 480534 ||  || — || September 23, 2011 || Kitt Peak || Spacewatch || (1298) || align=right | 2.6 km || 
|-id=535 bgcolor=#d6d6d6
| 480535 ||  || — || December 4, 2012 || Mount Lemmon || Mount Lemmon Survey || — || align=right | 2.8 km || 
|-id=536 bgcolor=#fefefe
| 480536 ||  || — || May 28, 2008 || Mount Lemmon || Mount Lemmon Survey || — || align=right data-sort-value="0.88" | 880 m || 
|-id=537 bgcolor=#E9E9E9
| 480537 ||  || — || June 21, 2007 || Mount Lemmon || Mount Lemmon Survey || MAR || align=right | 1.1 km || 
|-id=538 bgcolor=#E9E9E9
| 480538 ||  || — || October 24, 2008 || Kitt Peak || Spacewatch || — || align=right | 1.7 km || 
|-id=539 bgcolor=#d6d6d6
| 480539 ||  || — || November 20, 2006 || Kitt Peak || Spacewatch || EOS || align=right | 2.2 km || 
|-id=540 bgcolor=#d6d6d6
| 480540 ||  || — || November 22, 2006 || Kitt Peak || Spacewatch || EOS || align=right | 1.8 km || 
|-id=541 bgcolor=#d6d6d6
| 480541 ||  || — || May 16, 2009 || Kitt Peak || Spacewatch || — || align=right | 2.7 km || 
|-id=542 bgcolor=#d6d6d6
| 480542 ||  || — || December 24, 2011 || Mount Lemmon || Mount Lemmon Survey || — || align=right | 3.3 km || 
|-id=543 bgcolor=#d6d6d6
| 480543 ||  || — || November 22, 2006 || Kitt Peak || Spacewatch || — || align=right | 2.5 km || 
|-id=544 bgcolor=#d6d6d6
| 480544 ||  || — || July 2, 2010 || WISE || WISE || — || align=right | 4.2 km || 
|-id=545 bgcolor=#d6d6d6
| 480545 ||  || — || June 8, 2010 || WISE || WISE || — || align=right | 4.1 km || 
|-id=546 bgcolor=#d6d6d6
| 480546 ||  || — || October 20, 2011 || Mount Lemmon || Mount Lemmon Survey || — || align=right | 2.8 km || 
|-id=547 bgcolor=#E9E9E9
| 480547 ||  || — || December 14, 2004 || Kitt Peak || Spacewatch || — || align=right | 1.5 km || 
|-id=548 bgcolor=#E9E9E9
| 480548 ||  || — || January 6, 2010 || Kitt Peak || Spacewatch || — || align=right | 1.1 km || 
|-id=549 bgcolor=#d6d6d6
| 480549 ||  || — || May 2, 2009 || Siding Spring || SSS || — || align=right | 2.9 km || 
|-id=550 bgcolor=#E9E9E9
| 480550 ||  || — || September 14, 2007 || Mount Lemmon || Mount Lemmon Survey || — || align=right | 2.5 km || 
|-id=551 bgcolor=#d6d6d6
| 480551 ||  || — || January 31, 2013 || Mount Lemmon || Mount Lemmon Survey || — || align=right | 2.8 km || 
|-id=552 bgcolor=#d6d6d6
| 480552 ||  || — || June 21, 2010 || Mount Lemmon || Mount Lemmon Survey || EOS || align=right | 1.8 km || 
|-id=553 bgcolor=#d6d6d6
| 480553 ||  || — || December 24, 2006 || Kitt Peak || Spacewatch || EOS || align=right | 1.9 km || 
|-id=554 bgcolor=#E9E9E9
| 480554 ||  || — || January 15, 2009 || Kitt Peak || Spacewatch || MAR || align=right | 1.3 km || 
|-id=555 bgcolor=#E9E9E9
| 480555 ||  || — || March 26, 2001 || Kitt Peak || Spacewatch || — || align=right | 1.5 km || 
|-id=556 bgcolor=#E9E9E9
| 480556 ||  || — || September 19, 2006 || Kitt Peak || Spacewatch || — || align=right | 1.9 km || 
|-id=557 bgcolor=#d6d6d6
| 480557 ||  || — || May 19, 2010 || WISE || WISE || — || align=right | 2.7 km || 
|-id=558 bgcolor=#d6d6d6
| 480558 ||  || — || June 14, 2004 || Kitt Peak || Spacewatch || — || align=right | 5.1 km || 
|-id=559 bgcolor=#d6d6d6
| 480559 ||  || — || October 12, 2010 || Mount Lemmon || Mount Lemmon Survey || — || align=right | 3.0 km || 
|-id=560 bgcolor=#d6d6d6
| 480560 ||  || — || June 24, 2010 || WISE || WISE || VER || align=right | 2.6 km || 
|-id=561 bgcolor=#E9E9E9
| 480561 ||  || — || March 13, 2002 || Socorro || LINEAR || — || align=right | 1.3 km || 
|-id=562 bgcolor=#fefefe
| 480562 ||  || — || May 25, 2003 || Kitt Peak || Spacewatch || — || align=right data-sort-value="0.94" | 940 m || 
|-id=563 bgcolor=#fefefe
| 480563 ||  || — || November 4, 2005 || Kitt Peak || Spacewatch || V || align=right data-sort-value="0.73" | 730 m || 
|-id=564 bgcolor=#E9E9E9
| 480564 ||  || — || November 19, 2003 || Kitt Peak || Spacewatch || — || align=right | 1.6 km || 
|-id=565 bgcolor=#d6d6d6
| 480565 ||  || — || November 20, 2006 || Kitt Peak || Spacewatch || — || align=right | 2.5 km || 
|-id=566 bgcolor=#d6d6d6
| 480566 ||  || — || October 5, 2005 || Catalina || CSS || — || align=right | 4.2 km || 
|-id=567 bgcolor=#fefefe
| 480567 ||  || — || October 21, 2006 || Kitt Peak || Spacewatch || — || align=right data-sort-value="0.77" | 770 m || 
|-id=568 bgcolor=#E9E9E9
| 480568 ||  || — || August 29, 2006 || Kitt Peak || Spacewatch || HOF || align=right | 2.4 km || 
|-id=569 bgcolor=#d6d6d6
| 480569 ||  || — || August 29, 2005 || Kitt Peak || Spacewatch || — || align=right | 3.1 km || 
|-id=570 bgcolor=#d6d6d6
| 480570 ||  || — || September 17, 2004 || Kitt Peak || Spacewatch || — || align=right | 4.7 km || 
|-id=571 bgcolor=#E9E9E9
| 480571 ||  || — || March 11, 2005 || Mount Lemmon || Mount Lemmon Survey || — || align=right | 2.0 km || 
|-id=572 bgcolor=#d6d6d6
| 480572 ||  || — || December 18, 2007 || Mount Lemmon || Mount Lemmon Survey || — || align=right | 3.5 km || 
|-id=573 bgcolor=#E9E9E9
| 480573 ||  || — || November 5, 2007 || Kitt Peak || Spacewatch || AGN || align=right | 1.1 km || 
|-id=574 bgcolor=#d6d6d6
| 480574 ||  || — || May 22, 2010 || WISE || WISE || — || align=right | 2.7 km || 
|-id=575 bgcolor=#d6d6d6
| 480575 ||  || — || January 16, 2013 || Mount Lemmon || Mount Lemmon Survey || — || align=right | 2.5 km || 
|-id=576 bgcolor=#d6d6d6
| 480576 ||  || — || February 6, 2008 || Catalina || CSS || — || align=right | 3.3 km || 
|-id=577 bgcolor=#E9E9E9
| 480577 ||  || — || February 2, 2005 || Kitt Peak || Spacewatch || — || align=right | 1.4 km || 
|-id=578 bgcolor=#fefefe
| 480578 ||  || — || January 29, 2003 || Kitt Peak || Spacewatch || V || align=right data-sort-value="0.66" | 660 m || 
|-id=579 bgcolor=#d6d6d6
| 480579 ||  || — || December 18, 2001 || Socorro || LINEAR || EOS || align=right | 1.9 km || 
|-id=580 bgcolor=#d6d6d6
| 480580 ||  || — || October 1, 2005 || Mount Lemmon || Mount Lemmon Survey || — || align=right | 2.4 km || 
|-id=581 bgcolor=#d6d6d6
| 480581 ||  || — || July 12, 2005 || Kitt Peak || Spacewatch || — || align=right | 2.4 km || 
|-id=582 bgcolor=#d6d6d6
| 480582 ||  || — || November 1, 2005 || Catalina || CSS || — || align=right | 2.6 km || 
|-id=583 bgcolor=#d6d6d6
| 480583 ||  || — || May 29, 2010 || WISE || WISE || — || align=right | 4.9 km || 
|-id=584 bgcolor=#d6d6d6
| 480584 ||  || — || November 22, 2006 || Kitt Peak || Spacewatch || — || align=right | 3.5 km || 
|-id=585 bgcolor=#E9E9E9
| 480585 ||  || — || September 22, 2011 || Kitt Peak || Spacewatch || — || align=right | 2.0 km || 
|-id=586 bgcolor=#d6d6d6
| 480586 ||  || — || September 27, 2011 || Mount Lemmon || Mount Lemmon Survey || — || align=right | 2.3 km || 
|-id=587 bgcolor=#d6d6d6
| 480587 ||  || — || September 3, 2010 || Mount Lemmon || Mount Lemmon Survey || — || align=right | 2.3 km || 
|-id=588 bgcolor=#E9E9E9
| 480588 ||  || — || October 30, 2007 || Kitt Peak || Spacewatch || — || align=right | 2.2 km || 
|-id=589 bgcolor=#d6d6d6
| 480589 ||  || — || January 11, 2008 || Kitt Peak || Spacewatch || — || align=right | 2.4 km || 
|-id=590 bgcolor=#E9E9E9
| 480590 ||  || — || March 12, 2005 || Socorro || LINEAR || — || align=right | 1.6 km || 
|-id=591 bgcolor=#d6d6d6
| 480591 ||  || — || January 3, 2013 || Mount Lemmon || Mount Lemmon Survey || — || align=right | 2.6 km || 
|-id=592 bgcolor=#d6d6d6
| 480592 ||  || — || September 24, 1995 || Kitt Peak || Spacewatch || — || align=right | 2.2 km || 
|-id=593 bgcolor=#d6d6d6
| 480593 ||  || — || February 13, 2002 || Kitt Peak || Spacewatch || VER || align=right | 2.9 km || 
|-id=594 bgcolor=#d6d6d6
| 480594 ||  || — || October 22, 2011 || Kitt Peak || Spacewatch || — || align=right | 2.7 km || 
|-id=595 bgcolor=#d6d6d6
| 480595 ||  || — || November 16, 2011 || Mount Lemmon || Mount Lemmon Survey || — || align=right | 2.5 km || 
|-id=596 bgcolor=#d6d6d6
| 480596 ||  || — || November 18, 2011 || Mount Lemmon || Mount Lemmon Survey || EOS || align=right | 1.7 km || 
|-id=597 bgcolor=#d6d6d6
| 480597 ||  || — || October 30, 2005 || Kitt Peak || Spacewatch || — || align=right | 2.6 km || 
|-id=598 bgcolor=#d6d6d6
| 480598 ||  || — || June 21, 2010 || WISE || WISE || — || align=right | 2.3 km || 
|-id=599 bgcolor=#fefefe
| 480599 ||  || — || March 16, 2007 || Mount Lemmon || Mount Lemmon Survey || — || align=right | 1.3 km || 
|-id=600 bgcolor=#d6d6d6
| 480600 ||  || — || June 1, 2010 || WISE || WISE || — || align=right | 3.6 km || 
|}

480601–480700 

|-bgcolor=#E9E9E9
| 480601 ||  || — || October 14, 2012 || Mount Lemmon || Mount Lemmon Survey || — || align=right | 1.1 km || 
|-id=602 bgcolor=#E9E9E9
| 480602 ||  || — || January 20, 2009 || Mount Lemmon || Mount Lemmon Survey || — || align=right | 1.7 km || 
|-id=603 bgcolor=#E9E9E9
| 480603 ||  || — || March 19, 2010 || Mount Lemmon || Mount Lemmon Survey || — || align=right | 1.3 km || 
|-id=604 bgcolor=#E9E9E9
| 480604 ||  || — || January 28, 2004 || Kitt Peak || Spacewatch || AGN || align=right | 1.1 km || 
|-id=605 bgcolor=#d6d6d6
| 480605 ||  || — || August 31, 2005 || Kitt Peak || Spacewatch || — || align=right | 2.6 km || 
|-id=606 bgcolor=#d6d6d6
| 480606 ||  || — || April 30, 2009 || Kitt Peak || Spacewatch || EOS || align=right | 1.8 km || 
|-id=607 bgcolor=#E9E9E9
| 480607 ||  || — || April 11, 2010 || Kitt Peak || Spacewatch || — || align=right | 1.7 km || 
|-id=608 bgcolor=#d6d6d6
| 480608 ||  || — || May 20, 2010 || WISE || WISE || — || align=right | 4.6 km || 
|-id=609 bgcolor=#E9E9E9
| 480609 ||  || — || May 31, 2006 || Mount Lemmon || Mount Lemmon Survey || — || align=right | 2.1 km || 
|-id=610 bgcolor=#d6d6d6
| 480610 ||  || — || January 5, 2013 || Mount Lemmon || Mount Lemmon Survey || — || align=right | 3.1 km || 
|-id=611 bgcolor=#E9E9E9
| 480611 ||  || — || June 26, 2011 || Mount Lemmon || Mount Lemmon Survey || — || align=right | 1.9 km || 
|-id=612 bgcolor=#d6d6d6
| 480612 ||  || — || September 18, 2010 || Mount Lemmon || Mount Lemmon Survey || — || align=right | 3.4 km || 
|-id=613 bgcolor=#E9E9E9
| 480613 ||  || — || August 19, 2006 || Kitt Peak || Spacewatch || — || align=right | 2.5 km || 
|-id=614 bgcolor=#E9E9E9
| 480614 ||  || — || May 11, 2005 || Kitt Peak || Spacewatch || — || align=right | 1.7 km || 
|-id=615 bgcolor=#d6d6d6
| 480615 ||  || — || December 5, 2005 || Kitt Peak || Spacewatch || — || align=right | 3.7 km || 
|-id=616 bgcolor=#d6d6d6
| 480616 ||  || — || May 16, 2009 || Kitt Peak || Spacewatch || — || align=right | 2.3 km || 
|-id=617 bgcolor=#E9E9E9
| 480617 ||  || — || April 2, 2005 || Mount Lemmon || Mount Lemmon Survey || — || align=right | 1.8 km || 
|-id=618 bgcolor=#d6d6d6
| 480618 ||  || — || April 4, 2008 || Mount Lemmon || Mount Lemmon Survey || VER || align=right | 3.5 km || 
|-id=619 bgcolor=#d6d6d6
| 480619 ||  || — || November 18, 2011 || Mount Lemmon || Mount Lemmon Survey || — || align=right | 3.0 km || 
|-id=620 bgcolor=#E9E9E9
| 480620 ||  || — || May 6, 1997 || Kitt Peak || Spacewatch || — || align=right | 1.5 km || 
|-id=621 bgcolor=#d6d6d6
| 480621 ||  || — || September 29, 2005 || Mount Lemmon || Mount Lemmon Survey || EOS || align=right | 1.7 km || 
|-id=622 bgcolor=#E9E9E9
| 480622 ||  || — || October 10, 2007 || Kitt Peak || Spacewatch || — || align=right | 2.0 km || 
|-id=623 bgcolor=#d6d6d6
| 480623 ||  || — || December 13, 2006 || Mount Lemmon || Mount Lemmon Survey ||  || align=right | 2.8 km || 
|-id=624 bgcolor=#d6d6d6
| 480624 ||  || — || June 13, 2010 || WISE || WISE || — || align=right | 3.6 km || 
|-id=625 bgcolor=#d6d6d6
| 480625 ||  || — || September 10, 2004 || Socorro || LINEAR || — || align=right | 2.8 km || 
|-id=626 bgcolor=#E9E9E9
| 480626 ||  || — || November 3, 2008 || Mount Lemmon || Mount Lemmon Survey || MAR || align=right | 1.1 km || 
|-id=627 bgcolor=#d6d6d6
| 480627 ||  || — || April 29, 2009 || Mount Lemmon || Mount Lemmon Survey || LIX || align=right | 3.9 km || 
|-id=628 bgcolor=#E9E9E9
| 480628 ||  || — || February 11, 2004 || Kitt Peak || Spacewatch || — || align=right | 2.7 km || 
|-id=629 bgcolor=#d6d6d6
| 480629 ||  || — || October 31, 2005 || Mount Lemmon || Mount Lemmon Survey || — || align=right | 3.0 km || 
|-id=630 bgcolor=#d6d6d6
| 480630 ||  || — || April 4, 2008 || Mount Lemmon || Mount Lemmon Survey || EOS || align=right | 1.7 km || 
|-id=631 bgcolor=#E9E9E9
| 480631 ||  || — || October 14, 2007 || Mount Lemmon || Mount Lemmon Survey || — || align=right | 2.2 km || 
|-id=632 bgcolor=#E9E9E9
| 480632 ||  || — || November 5, 2007 || Kitt Peak || Spacewatch || — || align=right | 2.2 km || 
|-id=633 bgcolor=#E9E9E9
| 480633 ||  || — || December 15, 2007 || Kitt Peak || Spacewatch || — || align=right | 2.2 km || 
|-id=634 bgcolor=#d6d6d6
| 480634 ||  || — || February 16, 2013 || Mount Lemmon || Mount Lemmon Survey || — || align=right | 3.0 km || 
|-id=635 bgcolor=#E9E9E9
| 480635 ||  || — || June 12, 2011 || Mount Lemmon || Mount Lemmon Survey || — || align=right | 1.8 km || 
|-id=636 bgcolor=#d6d6d6
| 480636 ||  || — || December 11, 2006 || Kitt Peak || Spacewatch || — || align=right | 3.3 km || 
|-id=637 bgcolor=#d6d6d6
| 480637 ||  || — || October 26, 2005 || Kitt Peak || Spacewatch || — || align=right | 2.5 km || 
|-id=638 bgcolor=#d6d6d6
| 480638 ||  || — || May 22, 2010 || WISE || WISE || — || align=right | 2.5 km || 
|-id=639 bgcolor=#E9E9E9
| 480639 ||  || — || February 6, 2014 || Catalina || CSS || — || align=right | 2.5 km || 
|-id=640 bgcolor=#E9E9E9
| 480640 ||  || — || April 2, 2006 || Mount Lemmon || Mount Lemmon Survey || — || align=right | 2.9 km || 
|-id=641 bgcolor=#d6d6d6
| 480641 ||  || — || October 27, 2005 || Kitt Peak || Spacewatch || HYG || align=right | 3.0 km || 
|-id=642 bgcolor=#d6d6d6
| 480642 ||  || — || October 25, 2005 || Kitt Peak || Spacewatch || — || align=right | 3.3 km || 
|-id=643 bgcolor=#d6d6d6
| 480643 ||  || — || October 1, 2005 || Kitt Peak || Spacewatch || — || align=right | 2.5 km || 
|-id=644 bgcolor=#d6d6d6
| 480644 ||  || — || April 16, 2008 || Mount Lemmon || Mount Lemmon Survey || — || align=right | 3.1 km || 
|-id=645 bgcolor=#d6d6d6
| 480645 ||  || — || October 27, 2011 || Mount Lemmon || Mount Lemmon Survey || — || align=right | 3.2 km || 
|-id=646 bgcolor=#E9E9E9
| 480646 ||  || — || January 29, 2014 || Mount Lemmon || Mount Lemmon Survey || EUN || align=right | 1.3 km || 
|-id=647 bgcolor=#d6d6d6
| 480647 ||  || — || April 1, 2010 || WISE || WISE || — || align=right | 2.7 km || 
|-id=648 bgcolor=#E9E9E9
| 480648 ||  || — || September 30, 2003 || Kitt Peak || Spacewatch || — || align=right | 2.3 km || 
|-id=649 bgcolor=#E9E9E9
| 480649 ||  || — || July 2, 2011 || Kitt Peak || Spacewatch || EUN || align=right | 1.3 km || 
|-id=650 bgcolor=#d6d6d6
| 480650 ||  || — || September 15, 2010 || Mount Lemmon || Mount Lemmon Survey || — || align=right | 3.1 km || 
|-id=651 bgcolor=#E9E9E9
| 480651 ||  || — || November 9, 2007 || Kitt Peak || Spacewatch || — || align=right | 2.2 km || 
|-id=652 bgcolor=#d6d6d6
| 480652 ||  || — || January 5, 2013 || Mount Lemmon || Mount Lemmon Survey || EOS || align=right | 2.0 km || 
|-id=653 bgcolor=#d6d6d6
| 480653 ||  || — || June 15, 2010 || Mount Lemmon || Mount Lemmon Survey || BRA || align=right | 1.6 km || 
|-id=654 bgcolor=#E9E9E9
| 480654 ||  || — || January 10, 2013 || Kitt Peak || Spacewatch || (5) || align=right data-sort-value="0.98" | 980 m || 
|-id=655 bgcolor=#d6d6d6
| 480655 ||  || — || December 27, 2011 || Mount Lemmon || Mount Lemmon Survey || VER || align=right | 2.6 km || 
|-id=656 bgcolor=#d6d6d6
| 480656 ||  || — || November 15, 2006 || Mount Lemmon || Mount Lemmon Survey || EOS || align=right | 2.4 km || 
|-id=657 bgcolor=#d6d6d6
| 480657 ||  || — || August 23, 2004 || Kitt Peak || Spacewatch || — || align=right | 3.0 km || 
|-id=658 bgcolor=#d6d6d6
| 480658 ||  || — || July 18, 2010 || WISE || WISE || — || align=right | 3.9 km || 
|-id=659 bgcolor=#d6d6d6
| 480659 ||  || — || January 20, 2013 || Kitt Peak || Spacewatch || EOS || align=right | 1.9 km || 
|-id=660 bgcolor=#d6d6d6
| 480660 ||  || — || January 17, 2013 || Mount Lemmon || Mount Lemmon Survey || — || align=right | 4.0 km || 
|-id=661 bgcolor=#fefefe
| 480661 ||  || — || November 11, 2009 || Mount Lemmon || Mount Lemmon Survey || — || align=right data-sort-value="0.68" | 680 m || 
|-id=662 bgcolor=#d6d6d6
| 480662 ||  || — || September 14, 2009 || Kitt Peak || Spacewatch || 7:4 || align=right | 3.1 km || 
|-id=663 bgcolor=#d6d6d6
| 480663 ||  || — || October 1, 2005 || Kitt Peak || Spacewatch || — || align=right | 2.5 km || 
|-id=664 bgcolor=#d6d6d6
| 480664 ||  || — || January 14, 2013 || Mount Lemmon || Mount Lemmon Survey || EOS || align=right | 1.9 km || 
|-id=665 bgcolor=#E9E9E9
| 480665 ||  || — || January 31, 2006 || Mount Lemmon || Mount Lemmon Survey || — || align=right data-sort-value="0.97" | 970 m || 
|-id=666 bgcolor=#d6d6d6
| 480666 ||  || — || May 1, 2010 || WISE || WISE || — || align=right | 3.2 km || 
|-id=667 bgcolor=#E9E9E9
| 480667 ||  || — || November 4, 2007 || Kitt Peak || Spacewatch || — || align=right | 2.1 km || 
|-id=668 bgcolor=#E9E9E9
| 480668 ||  || — || March 12, 2010 || Kitt Peak || Spacewatch || — || align=right | 1.1 km || 
|-id=669 bgcolor=#E9E9E9
| 480669 ||  || — || November 20, 2007 || Mount Lemmon || Mount Lemmon Survey || — || align=right | 2.9 km || 
|-id=670 bgcolor=#d6d6d6
| 480670 ||  || — || March 8, 2008 || Mount Lemmon || Mount Lemmon Survey || — || align=right | 3.2 km || 
|-id=671 bgcolor=#d6d6d6
| 480671 ||  || — || September 11, 2010 || Kitt Peak || Spacewatch || HYG || align=right | 2.1 km || 
|-id=672 bgcolor=#d6d6d6
| 480672 ||  || — || November 17, 2006 || Kitt Peak || Spacewatch || EOS || align=right | 1.9 km || 
|-id=673 bgcolor=#d6d6d6
| 480673 ||  || — || May 14, 2009 || Mount Lemmon || Mount Lemmon Survey || — || align=right | 2.9 km || 
|-id=674 bgcolor=#d6d6d6
| 480674 ||  || — || November 11, 2005 || Kitt Peak || Spacewatch || — || align=right | 3.1 km || 
|-id=675 bgcolor=#d6d6d6
| 480675 ||  || — || April 17, 2009 || Mount Lemmon || Mount Lemmon Survey || — || align=right | 2.6 km || 
|-id=676 bgcolor=#d6d6d6
| 480676 ||  || — || June 27, 2010 || WISE || WISE || — || align=right | 2.8 km || 
|-id=677 bgcolor=#d6d6d6
| 480677 ||  || — || June 30, 2010 || WISE || WISE || — || align=right | 4.1 km || 
|-id=678 bgcolor=#E9E9E9
| 480678 ||  || — || November 19, 2007 || Mount Lemmon || Mount Lemmon Survey || AGN || align=right data-sort-value="0.98" | 980 m || 
|-id=679 bgcolor=#d6d6d6
| 480679 ||  || — || August 31, 2005 || Kitt Peak || Spacewatch || — || align=right | 2.2 km || 
|-id=680 bgcolor=#d6d6d6
| 480680 ||  || — || January 19, 2012 || Kitt Peak || Spacewatch || 7:4 || align=right | 3.6 km || 
|-id=681 bgcolor=#d6d6d6
| 480681 ||  || — || December 20, 2009 || Kitt Peak || Spacewatch || 3:2 || align=right | 6.2 km || 
|-id=682 bgcolor=#d6d6d6
| 480682 ||  || — || May 3, 2008 || Mount Lemmon || Mount Lemmon Survey || — || align=right | 2.8 km || 
|-id=683 bgcolor=#d6d6d6
| 480683 ||  || — || January 2, 2012 || Mount Lemmon || Mount Lemmon Survey || — || align=right | 3.5 km || 
|-id=684 bgcolor=#d6d6d6
| 480684 ||  || — || December 8, 2005 || Kitt Peak || Spacewatch || VER || align=right | 3.0 km || 
|-id=685 bgcolor=#d6d6d6
| 480685 ||  || — || January 17, 2007 || Kitt Peak || Spacewatch || — || align=right | 3.7 km || 
|-id=686 bgcolor=#E9E9E9
| 480686 ||  || — || June 2, 2006 || Kitt Peak || Spacewatch || — || align=right | 2.6 km || 
|-id=687 bgcolor=#E9E9E9
| 480687 ||  || — || April 30, 2009 || Mount Lemmon || Mount Lemmon Survey || HOF || align=right | 2.4 km || 
|-id=688 bgcolor=#E9E9E9
| 480688 ||  || — || November 19, 2007 || Kitt Peak || Spacewatch || — || align=right | 3.0 km || 
|-id=689 bgcolor=#E9E9E9
| 480689 ||  || — || March 21, 2009 || Kitt Peak || Spacewatch || AGN || align=right | 1.3 km || 
|-id=690 bgcolor=#d6d6d6
| 480690 ||  || — || October 1, 2011 || Kitt Peak || Spacewatch ||  || align=right | 2.2 km || 
|-id=691 bgcolor=#E9E9E9
| 480691 ||  || — || November 4, 2007 || Kitt Peak || Spacewatch || NEM || align=right | 1.9 km || 
|-id=692 bgcolor=#E9E9E9
| 480692 ||  || — || December 29, 2008 || Mount Lemmon || Mount Lemmon Survey || — || align=right | 1.8 km || 
|-id=693 bgcolor=#E9E9E9
| 480693 ||  || — || April 11, 2005 || Mount Lemmon || Mount Lemmon Survey || — || align=right | 1.8 km || 
|-id=694 bgcolor=#d6d6d6
| 480694 ||  || — || August 28, 2005 || Kitt Peak || Spacewatch || — || align=right | 2.4 km || 
|-id=695 bgcolor=#E9E9E9
| 480695 ||  || — || April 2, 2005 || Mount Lemmon || Mount Lemmon Survey || — || align=right | 2.5 km || 
|-id=696 bgcolor=#d6d6d6
| 480696 ||  || — || September 14, 2005 || Kitt Peak || Spacewatch || — || align=right | 2.4 km || 
|-id=697 bgcolor=#d6d6d6
| 480697 ||  || — || January 27, 2007 || Mount Lemmon || Mount Lemmon Survey || — || align=right | 3.2 km || 
|-id=698 bgcolor=#E9E9E9
| 480698 ||  || — || January 19, 2004 || Kitt Peak || Spacewatch || PAD || align=right | 1.6 km || 
|-id=699 bgcolor=#d6d6d6
| 480699 ||  || — || February 8, 2002 || Kitt Peak || Spacewatch || — || align=right | 2.6 km || 
|-id=700 bgcolor=#fefefe
| 480700 ||  || — || October 29, 2005 || Catalina || CSS || — || align=right data-sort-value="0.90" | 900 m || 
|}

480701–480800 

|-bgcolor=#E9E9E9
| 480701 ||  || — || October 16, 2003 || Kitt Peak || Spacewatch || — || align=right | 1.5 km || 
|-id=702 bgcolor=#d6d6d6
| 480702 ||  || — || December 27, 1999 || Kitt Peak || Spacewatch || fast? || align=right | 3.5 km || 
|-id=703 bgcolor=#E9E9E9
| 480703 ||  || — || March 17, 2010 || WISE || WISE || — || align=right | 2.6 km || 
|-id=704 bgcolor=#d6d6d6
| 480704 ||  || — || September 13, 2005 || Kitt Peak || Spacewatch || — || align=right | 2.2 km || 
|-id=705 bgcolor=#d6d6d6
| 480705 ||  || — || November 21, 2006 || Mount Lemmon || Mount Lemmon Survey || — || align=right | 4.6 km || 
|-id=706 bgcolor=#d6d6d6
| 480706 ||  || — || November 26, 2005 || Mount Lemmon || Mount Lemmon Survey || HYG || align=right | 3.1 km || 
|-id=707 bgcolor=#d6d6d6
| 480707 ||  || — || December 11, 2006 || Kitt Peak || Spacewatch || — || align=right | 5.1 km || 
|-id=708 bgcolor=#d6d6d6
| 480708 ||  || — || August 7, 2010 || WISE || WISE || — || align=right | 4.0 km || 
|-id=709 bgcolor=#E9E9E9
| 480709 ||  || — || July 11, 1997 || Kitt Peak || Spacewatch || — || align=right | 2.0 km || 
|-id=710 bgcolor=#d6d6d6
| 480710 ||  || — || September 18, 2010 || Mount Lemmon || Mount Lemmon Survey || — || align=right | 3.0 km || 
|-id=711 bgcolor=#d6d6d6
| 480711 ||  || — || February 8, 2008 || Kitt Peak || Spacewatch || THM || align=right | 2.3 km || 
|-id=712 bgcolor=#d6d6d6
| 480712 ||  || — || September 4, 2007 || Mount Lemmon || Mount Lemmon Survey || 3:2 || align=right | 4.2 km || 
|-id=713 bgcolor=#d6d6d6
| 480713 ||  || — || November 11, 2010 || Mount Lemmon || Mount Lemmon Survey || — || align=right | 3.3 km || 
|-id=714 bgcolor=#d6d6d6
| 480714 ||  || — || February 27, 2006 || Kitt Peak || Spacewatch || THM || align=right | 2.7 km || 
|-id=715 bgcolor=#d6d6d6
| 480715 ||  || — || April 19, 2007 || Mount Lemmon || Mount Lemmon Survey || — || align=right | 3.7 km || 
|-id=716 bgcolor=#d6d6d6
| 480716 ||  || — || August 21, 1999 || Kitt Peak || Spacewatch || — || align=right | 3.4 km || 
|-id=717 bgcolor=#d6d6d6
| 480717 ||  || — || February 17, 2007 || Mount Lemmon || Mount Lemmon Survey || — || align=right | 3.9 km || 
|-id=718 bgcolor=#fefefe
| 480718 ||  || — || February 2, 2006 || Kitt Peak || Spacewatch || — || align=right data-sort-value="0.81" | 810 m || 
|-id=719 bgcolor=#E9E9E9
| 480719 ||  || — || September 17, 2006 || Catalina || CSS || JUN || align=right | 1.8 km || 
|-id=720 bgcolor=#d6d6d6
| 480720 ||  || — || March 14, 2007 || Kitt Peak || Spacewatch || — || align=right | 2.5 km || 
|-id=721 bgcolor=#d6d6d6
| 480721 ||  || — || November 6, 2005 || Mount Lemmon || Mount Lemmon Survey || — || align=right | 2.8 km || 
|-id=722 bgcolor=#d6d6d6
| 480722 ||  || — || October 10, 2004 || Kitt Peak || Spacewatch || VER || align=right | 3.5 km || 
|-id=723 bgcolor=#E9E9E9
| 480723 ||  || — || October 22, 2006 || Kitt Peak || Spacewatch || AGN || align=right | 1.5 km || 
|-id=724 bgcolor=#d6d6d6
| 480724 ||  || — || March 26, 2007 || Mount Lemmon || Mount Lemmon Survey || — || align=right | 3.3 km || 
|-id=725 bgcolor=#d6d6d6
| 480725 ||  || — || November 3, 2010 || Mount Lemmon || Mount Lemmon Survey || EOS || align=right | 2.1 km || 
|-id=726 bgcolor=#d6d6d6
| 480726 ||  || — || December 5, 2005 || Kitt Peak || Spacewatch || — || align=right | 3.3 km || 
|-id=727 bgcolor=#fefefe
| 480727 ||  || — || June 25, 2009 || Siding Spring || SSS || — || align=right | 2.8 km || 
|-id=728 bgcolor=#d6d6d6
| 480728 ||  || — || July 16, 2005 || Catalina || CSS || — || align=right | 3.7 km || 
|-id=729 bgcolor=#E9E9E9
| 480729 ||  || — || July 1, 2008 || Kitt Peak || Spacewatch || — || align=right | 1.3 km || 
|-id=730 bgcolor=#E9E9E9
| 480730 ||  || — || September 9, 1999 || Socorro || LINEAR || — || align=right | 1.5 km || 
|-id=731 bgcolor=#fefefe
| 480731 ||  || — || April 28, 2012 || Mount Lemmon || Mount Lemmon Survey || — || align=right data-sort-value="0.77" | 770 m || 
|-id=732 bgcolor=#fefefe
| 480732 ||  || — || September 19, 2006 || Catalina || CSS || — || align=right data-sort-value="0.89" | 890 m || 
|-id=733 bgcolor=#fefefe
| 480733 ||  || — || June 13, 2005 || Mount Lemmon || Mount Lemmon Survey || NYS || align=right data-sort-value="0.61" | 610 m || 
|-id=734 bgcolor=#fefefe
| 480734 ||  || — || October 30, 2005 || Kitt Peak || Spacewatch || — || align=right data-sort-value="0.82" | 820 m || 
|-id=735 bgcolor=#d6d6d6
| 480735 ||  || — || February 26, 2009 || Catalina || CSS || — || align=right | 3.1 km || 
|-id=736 bgcolor=#E9E9E9
| 480736 ||  || — || October 13, 2012 || Catalina || CSS || — || align=right | 2.4 km || 
|-id=737 bgcolor=#E9E9E9
| 480737 ||  || — || April 2, 2006 || Catalina || CSS || GEF || align=right | 1.6 km || 
|-id=738 bgcolor=#fefefe
| 480738 ||  || — || November 1, 2013 || Mount Lemmon || Mount Lemmon Survey || — || align=right data-sort-value="0.81" | 810 m || 
|-id=739 bgcolor=#fefefe
| 480739 ||  || — || January 31, 1997 || Kitt Peak || Spacewatch || — || align=right | 1.0 km || 
|-id=740 bgcolor=#E9E9E9
| 480740 ||  || — || January 5, 2006 || Mount Lemmon || Mount Lemmon Survey || — || align=right | 1.6 km || 
|-id=741 bgcolor=#E9E9E9
| 480741 ||  || — || May 5, 2003 || Kitt Peak || Spacewatch || — || align=right | 1.4 km || 
|-id=742 bgcolor=#d6d6d6
| 480742 ||  || — || October 16, 2012 || Mount Lemmon || Mount Lemmon Survey || — || align=right | 3.0 km || 
|-id=743 bgcolor=#E9E9E9
| 480743 ||  || — || May 21, 2012 || Mount Lemmon || Mount Lemmon Survey || MAR || align=right data-sort-value="0.94" | 940 m || 
|-id=744 bgcolor=#E9E9E9
| 480744 ||  || — || May 2, 2011 || Catalina || CSS || — || align=right | 2.6 km || 
|-id=745 bgcolor=#E9E9E9
| 480745 ||  || — || July 30, 2012 || Siding Spring || SSS || — || align=right | 2.2 km || 
|-id=746 bgcolor=#fefefe
| 480746 ||  || — || January 26, 2000 || Kitt Peak || Spacewatch || — || align=right | 1.1 km || 
|-id=747 bgcolor=#E9E9E9
| 480747 ||  || — || June 13, 2007 || Catalina || CSS || — || align=right | 4.2 km || 
|-id=748 bgcolor=#d6d6d6
| 480748 ||  || — || November 2, 2007 || Kitt Peak || Spacewatch || — || align=right | 3.5 km || 
|-id=749 bgcolor=#d6d6d6
| 480749 ||  || — || October 20, 2012 || Kitt Peak || Spacewatch || — || align=right | 3.0 km || 
|-id=750 bgcolor=#fefefe
| 480750 ||  || — || April 25, 2000 || Anderson Mesa || LONEOS || — || align=right | 1.1 km || 
|-id=751 bgcolor=#E9E9E9
| 480751 ||  || — || March 14, 2007 || Mount Lemmon || Mount Lemmon Survey || — || align=right | 1.3 km || 
|-id=752 bgcolor=#E9E9E9
| 480752 ||  || — || February 15, 2010 || Kitt Peak || Spacewatch || WIT || align=right data-sort-value="0.98" | 980 m || 
|-id=753 bgcolor=#d6d6d6
| 480753 ||  || — || February 28, 2008 || Mount Lemmon || Mount Lemmon Survey || — || align=right | 2.7 km || 
|-id=754 bgcolor=#E9E9E9
| 480754 ||  || — || April 28, 2011 || Mount Lemmon || Mount Lemmon Survey || — || align=right | 1.0 km || 
|-id=755 bgcolor=#d6d6d6
| 480755 ||  || — || May 13, 2010 || Kitt Peak || Spacewatch || — || align=right | 2.3 km || 
|-id=756 bgcolor=#E9E9E9
| 480756 ||  || — || May 12, 2007 || Mount Lemmon || Mount Lemmon Survey || — || align=right | 1.2 km || 
|-id=757 bgcolor=#E9E9E9
| 480757 ||  || — || August 10, 2007 || Kitt Peak || Spacewatch || HOF || align=right | 2.6 km || 
|-id=758 bgcolor=#E9E9E9
| 480758 ||  || — || February 9, 2010 || Kitt Peak || Spacewatch || — || align=right | 1.5 km || 
|-id=759 bgcolor=#d6d6d6
| 480759 ||  || — || May 18, 2004 || Campo Imperatore || CINEOS || — || align=right | 3.4 km || 
|-id=760 bgcolor=#E9E9E9
| 480760 ||  || — || January 27, 2006 || Mount Lemmon || Mount Lemmon Survey || — || align=right data-sort-value="0.94" | 940 m || 
|-id=761 bgcolor=#d6d6d6
| 480761 ||  || — || November 5, 2007 || Kitt Peak || Spacewatch || — || align=right | 3.1 km || 
|-id=762 bgcolor=#E9E9E9
| 480762 ||  || — || December 1, 2005 || Mount Lemmon || Mount Lemmon Survey || — || align=right | 1.7 km || 
|-id=763 bgcolor=#E9E9E9
| 480763 ||  || — || October 2, 2003 || Kitt Peak || Spacewatch || — || align=right | 2.6 km || 
|-id=764 bgcolor=#fefefe
| 480764 ||  || — || May 28, 2009 || Mount Lemmon || Mount Lemmon Survey || — || align=right data-sort-value="0.65" | 650 m || 
|-id=765 bgcolor=#d6d6d6
| 480765 ||  || — || May 13, 2010 || WISE || WISE || — || align=right | 3.9 km || 
|-id=766 bgcolor=#fefefe
| 480766 ||  || — || September 29, 2009 || Mount Lemmon || Mount Lemmon Survey || — || align=right data-sort-value="0.70" | 700 m || 
|-id=767 bgcolor=#d6d6d6
| 480767 ||  || — || December 18, 2007 || Mount Lemmon || Mount Lemmon Survey || — || align=right | 3.0 km || 
|-id=768 bgcolor=#E9E9E9
| 480768 ||  || — || March 3, 2006 || Anderson Mesa || LONEOS || — || align=right | 1.5 km || 
|-id=769 bgcolor=#d6d6d6
| 480769 ||  || — || November 20, 2006 || Kitt Peak || Spacewatch || — || align=right | 2.3 km || 
|-id=770 bgcolor=#d6d6d6
| 480770 ||  || — || December 4, 2007 || Kitt Peak || Spacewatch || — || align=right | 2.5 km || 
|-id=771 bgcolor=#fefefe
| 480771 ||  || — || January 26, 2007 || Kitt Peak || Spacewatch || SUL || align=right | 2.3 km || 
|-id=772 bgcolor=#d6d6d6
| 480772 ||  || — || April 10, 2010 || Mount Lemmon || Mount Lemmon Survey || EOS || align=right | 1.8 km || 
|-id=773 bgcolor=#E9E9E9
| 480773 ||  || — || September 11, 2007 || Mount Lemmon || Mount Lemmon Survey || — || align=right | 1.7 km || 
|-id=774 bgcolor=#d6d6d6
| 480774 ||  || — || August 30, 2005 || Campo Imperatore || CINEOS || — || align=right | 3.4 km || 
|-id=775 bgcolor=#E9E9E9
| 480775 ||  || — || November 19, 2003 || Kitt Peak || Spacewatch || — || align=right | 3.4 km || 
|-id=776 bgcolor=#d6d6d6
| 480776 ||  || — || November 15, 2006 || Kitt Peak || Spacewatch || — || align=right | 2.9 km || 
|-id=777 bgcolor=#d6d6d6
| 480777 ||  || — || October 17, 2006 || Mount Lemmon || Mount Lemmon Survey || — || align=right | 3.6 km || 
|-id=778 bgcolor=#E9E9E9
| 480778 ||  || — || April 25, 2007 || Kitt Peak || Spacewatch || EUN || align=right | 1.1 km || 
|-id=779 bgcolor=#E9E9E9
| 480779 ||  || — || April 26, 2011 || Mount Lemmon || Mount Lemmon Survey || — || align=right | 2.2 km || 
|-id=780 bgcolor=#fefefe
| 480780 ||  || — || May 1, 2006 || Kitt Peak || Spacewatch || — || align=right data-sort-value="0.78" | 780 m || 
|-id=781 bgcolor=#fefefe
| 480781 ||  || — || March 15, 2007 || Mount Lemmon || Mount Lemmon Survey || — || align=right | 1.0 km || 
|-id=782 bgcolor=#fefefe
| 480782 ||  || — || December 8, 2010 || Mount Lemmon || Mount Lemmon Survey || — || align=right data-sort-value="0.59" | 590 m || 
|-id=783 bgcolor=#d6d6d6
| 480783 ||  || — || January 31, 2008 || Kitt Peak || Spacewatch || — || align=right | 5.4 km || 
|-id=784 bgcolor=#E9E9E9
| 480784 ||  || — || September 18, 2003 || Kitt Peak || Spacewatch || — || align=right | 1.8 km || 
|-id=785 bgcolor=#d6d6d6
| 480785 ||  || — || November 17, 2006 || Mount Lemmon || Mount Lemmon Survey || — || align=right | 3.1 km || 
|-id=786 bgcolor=#fefefe
| 480786 ||  || — || April 15, 2001 || Kitt Peak || Spacewatch || V || align=right data-sort-value="0.68" | 680 m || 
|-id=787 bgcolor=#d6d6d6
| 480787 ||  || — || March 13, 2010 || WISE || WISE || — || align=right | 2.9 km || 
|-id=788 bgcolor=#E9E9E9
| 480788 ||  || — || September 21, 2008 || Siding Spring || SSS || — || align=right | 3.0 km || 
|-id=789 bgcolor=#d6d6d6
| 480789 ||  || — || April 2, 2009 || Kitt Peak || Spacewatch || — || align=right | 5.0 km || 
|-id=790 bgcolor=#d6d6d6
| 480790 ||  || — || October 23, 2006 || Mount Lemmon || Mount Lemmon Survey || VER || align=right | 5.5 km || 
|-id=791 bgcolor=#d6d6d6
| 480791 ||  || — || November 18, 2006 || Kitt Peak || Spacewatch || — || align=right | 2.7 km || 
|-id=792 bgcolor=#FA8072
| 480792 ||  || — || June 13, 2013 || Kitt Peak || Spacewatch || H || align=right data-sort-value="0.73" | 730 m || 
|-id=793 bgcolor=#E9E9E9
| 480793 ||  || — || September 27, 2008 || Catalina || CSS || EUN || align=right | 1.3 km || 
|-id=794 bgcolor=#d6d6d6
| 480794 ||  || — || December 19, 2001 || Kitt Peak || Spacewatch || — || align=right | 3.1 km || 
|-id=795 bgcolor=#fefefe
| 480795 ||  || — || April 27, 2009 || Mount Lemmon || Mount Lemmon Survey || — || align=right data-sort-value="0.83" | 830 m || 
|-id=796 bgcolor=#d6d6d6
| 480796 ||  || — || March 28, 2009 || Kitt Peak || Spacewatch || — || align=right | 3.2 km || 
|-id=797 bgcolor=#fefefe
| 480797 ||  || — || May 3, 2005 || Kitt Peak || Spacewatch || — || align=right data-sort-value="0.68" | 680 m || 
|-id=798 bgcolor=#d6d6d6
| 480798 ||  || — || December 3, 2012 || Mount Lemmon || Mount Lemmon Survey || EOS || align=right | 2.1 km || 
|-id=799 bgcolor=#d6d6d6
| 480799 ||  || — || September 8, 2005 || Siding Spring || SSS || — || align=right | 5.0 km || 
|-id=800 bgcolor=#E9E9E9
| 480800 ||  || — || November 18, 2008 || Kitt Peak || Spacewatch || — || align=right | 1.4 km || 
|}

480801–480900 

|-bgcolor=#E9E9E9
| 480801 ||  || — || December 25, 2005 || Mount Lemmon || Mount Lemmon Survey || — || align=right data-sort-value="0.76" | 760 m || 
|-id=802 bgcolor=#E9E9E9
| 480802 ||  || — || May 19, 2010 || WISE || WISE || DOR || align=right | 2.3 km || 
|-id=803 bgcolor=#d6d6d6
| 480803 ||  || — || October 28, 2011 || Mount Lemmon || Mount Lemmon Survey || — || align=right | 3.3 km || 
|-id=804 bgcolor=#d6d6d6
| 480804 ||  || — || January 15, 2008 || Mount Lemmon || Mount Lemmon Survey || — || align=right | 3.2 km || 
|-id=805 bgcolor=#E9E9E9
| 480805 ||  || — || September 24, 1960 || Palomar || PLS || — || align=right | 1.4 km || 
|-id=806 bgcolor=#E9E9E9
| 480806 ||  || — || March 25, 1971 || Palomar || PLS || — || align=right | 1.7 km || 
|-id=807 bgcolor=#fefefe
| 480807 ||  || — || September 28, 1994 || Kitt Peak || Spacewatch || NYS || align=right data-sort-value="0.52" | 520 m || 
|-id=808 bgcolor=#FFC2E0
| 480808 ||  || — || December 6, 1994 || Siding Spring || R. H. McNaught || ATEPHAcritical || align=right data-sort-value="0.23" | 230 m || 
|-id=809 bgcolor=#fefefe
| 480809 ||  || — || September 17, 1995 || Kitt Peak || Spacewatch || — || align=right data-sort-value="0.73" | 730 m || 
|-id=810 bgcolor=#E9E9E9
| 480810 ||  || — || September 18, 1995 || Kitt Peak || Spacewatch || — || align=right data-sort-value="0.94" | 940 m || 
|-id=811 bgcolor=#E9E9E9
| 480811 ||  || — || October 28, 1995 || Kitt Peak || Spacewatch || — || align=right data-sort-value="0.97" | 970 m || 
|-id=812 bgcolor=#d6d6d6
| 480812 ||  || — || November 18, 1995 || Kitt Peak || Spacewatch || — || align=right | 2.2 km || 
|-id=813 bgcolor=#E9E9E9
| 480813 ||  || — || November 18, 1995 || Kitt Peak || Spacewatch || — || align=right data-sort-value="0.91" | 910 m || 
|-id=814 bgcolor=#E9E9E9
| 480814 ||  || — || December 14, 1995 || Kitt Peak || Spacewatch || EUN || align=right | 1.2 km || 
|-id=815 bgcolor=#d6d6d6
| 480815 ||  || — || January 13, 1996 || Kitt Peak || Spacewatch || EOS || align=right | 1.9 km || 
|-id=816 bgcolor=#fefefe
| 480816 ||  || — || July 1, 1997 || Kitt Peak || Spacewatch || — || align=right data-sort-value="0.85" | 850 m || 
|-id=817 bgcolor=#FFC2E0
| 480817 ||  || — || September 18, 1998 || Caussols || ODAS || AMO +1km || align=right data-sort-value="0.85" | 850 m || 
|-id=818 bgcolor=#d6d6d6
| 480818 ||  || — || September 17, 1998 || Anderson Mesa || LONEOS || — || align=right | 3.1 km || 
|-id=819 bgcolor=#FA8072
| 480819 ||  || — || September 26, 1998 || Socorro || LINEAR || — || align=right data-sort-value="0.70" | 700 m || 
|-id=820 bgcolor=#FFC2E0
| 480820 ||  || — || November 14, 1998 || Socorro || LINEAR || ATEPHA || align=right data-sort-value="0.24" | 240 m || 
|-id=821 bgcolor=#FA8072
| 480821 ||  || — || November 19, 1998 || Catalina || CSS || — || align=right | 1.4 km || 
|-id=822 bgcolor=#FFC2E0
| 480822 ||  || — || December 19, 1998 || Oohira || T. Urata || APOPHA || align=right data-sort-value="0.41" | 410 m || 
|-id=823 bgcolor=#FFC2E0
| 480823 ||  || — || December 19, 1998 || Socorro || LINEAR || APO || align=right data-sort-value="0.34" | 340 m || 
|-id=824 bgcolor=#FFC2E0
| 480824 ||  || — || May 10, 1999 || Anderson Mesa || LONEOS || AMO +1km || align=right | 1.6 km || 
|-id=825 bgcolor=#E9E9E9
| 480825 ||  || — || August 3, 1999 || Siding Spring || R. H. McNaught || — || align=right | 1.2 km || 
|-id=826 bgcolor=#E9E9E9
| 480826 ||  || — || October 10, 1999 || Kitt Peak || Spacewatch || — || align=right data-sort-value="0.66" | 660 m || 
|-id=827 bgcolor=#FA8072
| 480827 ||  || — || October 6, 1999 || Socorro || LINEAR || — || align=right data-sort-value="0.66" | 660 m || 
|-id=828 bgcolor=#E9E9E9
| 480828 ||  || — || October 12, 1999 || Socorro || LINEAR || — || align=right data-sort-value="0.80" | 800 m || 
|-id=829 bgcolor=#E9E9E9
| 480829 ||  || — || October 15, 1999 || Socorro || LINEAR || (5) || align=right data-sort-value="0.71" | 710 m || 
|-id=830 bgcolor=#E9E9E9
| 480830 ||  || — || October 3, 1999 || Kitt Peak || Spacewatch || — || align=right | 1.3 km || 
|-id=831 bgcolor=#E9E9E9
| 480831 ||  || — || October 2, 1999 || Socorro || LINEAR || — || align=right | 1.0 km || 
|-id=832 bgcolor=#E9E9E9
| 480832 ||  || — || November 1, 1999 || Olathe || Olathe || — || align=right | 1.1 km || 
|-id=833 bgcolor=#FA8072
| 480833 ||  || — || November 1, 1999 || Catalina || CSS || — || align=right data-sort-value="0.93" | 930 m || 
|-id=834 bgcolor=#d6d6d6
| 480834 ||  || — || November 1, 1999 || Kitt Peak || Spacewatch || — || align=right | 3.4 km || 
|-id=835 bgcolor=#d6d6d6
| 480835 ||  || — || November 4, 1999 || Socorro || LINEAR || — || align=right | 4.5 km || 
|-id=836 bgcolor=#E9E9E9
| 480836 ||  || — || November 4, 1999 || Kitt Peak || Spacewatch || — || align=right | 1.3 km || 
|-id=837 bgcolor=#fefefe
| 480837 ||  || — || November 5, 1999 || Kitt Peak || Spacewatch || — || align=right data-sort-value="0.45" | 450 m || 
|-id=838 bgcolor=#FA8072
| 480838 ||  || — || November 1, 1999 || Kitt Peak || Spacewatch || — || align=right data-sort-value="0.78" | 780 m || 
|-id=839 bgcolor=#E9E9E9
| 480839 ||  || — || January 7, 2000 || Socorro || LINEAR || — || align=right | 1.8 km || 
|-id=840 bgcolor=#fefefe
| 480840 ||  || — || January 6, 2000 || Kitt Peak || Spacewatch || — || align=right data-sort-value="0.83" | 830 m || 
|-id=841 bgcolor=#E9E9E9
| 480841 ||  || — || January 30, 2000 || Socorro || LINEAR || — || align=right | 3.5 km || 
|-id=842 bgcolor=#E9E9E9
| 480842 ||  || — || February 2, 2000 || Socorro || LINEAR || — || align=right | 1.6 km || 
|-id=843 bgcolor=#d6d6d6
| 480843 ||  || — || May 26, 2000 || Kitt Peak || Spacewatch || BRA || align=right | 1.6 km || 
|-id=844 bgcolor=#d6d6d6
| 480844 ||  || — || August 2, 2000 || Socorro || LINEAR || — || align=right | 3.0 km || 
|-id=845 bgcolor=#FA8072
| 480845 ||  || — || August 31, 2000 || Socorro || LINEAR || — || align=right data-sort-value="0.59" | 590 m || 
|-id=846 bgcolor=#d6d6d6
| 480846 ||  || — || September 24, 2000 || Socorro || LINEAR || — || align=right | 3.1 km || 
|-id=847 bgcolor=#fefefe
| 480847 ||  || — || September 24, 2000 || Socorro || LINEAR || NYS || align=right data-sort-value="0.83" | 830 m || 
|-id=848 bgcolor=#fefefe
| 480848 ||  || — || September 24, 2000 || Socorro || LINEAR || — || align=right | 1.1 km || 
|-id=849 bgcolor=#fefefe
| 480849 ||  || — || September 30, 2000 || Socorro || LINEAR || — || align=right | 1.2 km || 
|-id=850 bgcolor=#fefefe
| 480850 ||  || — || October 1, 2000 || Socorro || LINEAR || — || align=right data-sort-value="0.89" | 890 m || 
|-id=851 bgcolor=#d6d6d6
| 480851 ||  || — || November 19, 2000 || Socorro || LINEAR || — || align=right | 2.7 km || 
|-id=852 bgcolor=#d6d6d6
| 480852 ||  || — || November 24, 2000 || Mauna Kea || D. J. Tholen || criticalTj (2.91) || align=right | 1.9 km || 
|-id=853 bgcolor=#d6d6d6
| 480853 ||  || — || December 22, 2000 || Oaxaca || J. M. Roe || — || align=right | 2.8 km || 
|-id=854 bgcolor=#FFC2E0
| 480854 ||  || — || January 3, 2001 || Socorro || LINEAR || AMO +1kmcritical || align=right data-sort-value="0.85" | 850 m || 
|-id=855 bgcolor=#E9E9E9
| 480855 ||  || — || April 14, 2001 || Socorro || LINEAR || — || align=right | 1.5 km || 
|-id=856 bgcolor=#FFC2E0
| 480856 ||  || — || July 11, 2001 || Palomar || NEAT || AMO +1km || align=right data-sort-value="0.83" | 830 m || 
|-id=857 bgcolor=#fefefe
| 480857 ||  || — || July 26, 2001 || Palomar || NEAT || — || align=right | 1.2 km || 
|-id=858 bgcolor=#FFC2E0
| 480858 ||  || — || August 11, 2001 || Haleakala || NEAT || APOPHA || align=right data-sort-value="0.25" | 250 m || 
|-id=859 bgcolor=#d6d6d6
| 480859 ||  || — || August 17, 2001 || Socorro || LINEAR || — || align=right | 2.9 km || 
|-id=860 bgcolor=#fefefe
| 480860 ||  || — || August 24, 2001 || Haleakala || NEAT || — || align=right | 1.1 km || 
|-id=861 bgcolor=#FA8072
| 480861 ||  || — || September 12, 2001 || Socorro || LINEAR || H || align=right data-sort-value="0.59" | 590 m || 
|-id=862 bgcolor=#fefefe
| 480862 ||  || — || September 8, 2001 || Socorro || LINEAR || — || align=right | 2.9 km || 
|-id=863 bgcolor=#FA8072
| 480863 ||  || — || September 17, 2001 || Socorro || LINEAR || H || align=right data-sort-value="0.83" | 830 m || 
|-id=864 bgcolor=#fefefe
| 480864 ||  || — || September 16, 2001 || Socorro || LINEAR || — || align=right data-sort-value="0.76" | 760 m || 
|-id=865 bgcolor=#fefefe
| 480865 ||  || — || September 16, 2001 || Socorro || LINEAR || — || align=right data-sort-value="0.69" | 690 m || 
|-id=866 bgcolor=#fefefe
| 480866 ||  || — || September 19, 2001 || Socorro || LINEAR || NYS || align=right data-sort-value="0.58" | 580 m || 
|-id=867 bgcolor=#fefefe
| 480867 ||  || — || September 19, 2001 || Socorro || LINEAR || — || align=right data-sort-value="0.80" | 800 m || 
|-id=868 bgcolor=#fefefe
| 480868 ||  || — || September 11, 2001 || Kitt Peak || Spacewatch || — || align=right data-sort-value="0.81" | 810 m || 
|-id=869 bgcolor=#fefefe
| 480869 ||  || — || September 19, 2001 || Socorro || LINEAR || — || align=right data-sort-value="0.78" | 780 m || 
|-id=870 bgcolor=#fefefe
| 480870 ||  || — || September 19, 2001 || Socorro || LINEAR || — || align=right data-sort-value="0.87" | 870 m || 
|-id=871 bgcolor=#fefefe
| 480871 ||  || — || September 19, 2001 || Socorro || LINEAR || — || align=right data-sort-value="0.68" | 680 m || 
|-id=872 bgcolor=#fefefe
| 480872 ||  || — || September 19, 2001 || Kitt Peak || Spacewatch || NYS || align=right data-sort-value="0.49" | 490 m || 
|-id=873 bgcolor=#fefefe
| 480873 ||  || — || September 22, 2001 || Kitt Peak || Spacewatch || MAScritical || align=right data-sort-value="0.49" | 490 m || 
|-id=874 bgcolor=#d6d6d6
| 480874 ||  || — || October 14, 2001 || Socorro || LINEAR || — || align=right | 3.9 km || 
|-id=875 bgcolor=#FA8072
| 480875 ||  || — || October 17, 2001 || Socorro || LINEAR || — || align=right | 1.5 km || 
|-id=876 bgcolor=#FA8072
| 480876 ||  || — || November 12, 2001 || Socorro || LINEAR || — || align=right data-sort-value="0.77" | 770 m || 
|-id=877 bgcolor=#fefefe
| 480877 ||  || — || November 12, 2001 || Apache Point || SDSS || — || align=right data-sort-value="0.70" | 700 m || 
|-id=878 bgcolor=#E9E9E9
| 480878 ||  || — || October 23, 2001 || Kitt Peak || Spacewatch || — || align=right | 2.7 km || 
|-id=879 bgcolor=#fefefe
| 480879 ||  || — || November 19, 2001 || Socorro || LINEAR || — || align=right data-sort-value="0.80" | 800 m || 
|-id=880 bgcolor=#FA8072
| 480880 ||  || — || December 9, 2001 || Socorro || LINEAR || — || align=right data-sort-value="0.86" | 860 m || 
|-id=881 bgcolor=#FA8072
| 480881 ||  || — || November 21, 2001 || Socorro || LINEAR || — || align=right | 1.1 km || 
|-id=882 bgcolor=#fefefe
| 480882 ||  || — || December 14, 2001 || Socorro || LINEAR || — || align=right data-sort-value="0.80" | 800 m || 
|-id=883 bgcolor=#FFC2E0
| 480883 ||  || — || December 21, 2001 || Socorro || LINEAR || ATEPHA || align=right data-sort-value="0.24" | 240 m || 
|-id=884 bgcolor=#fefefe
| 480884 ||  || — || January 9, 2002 || Cima Ekar || ADAS || H || align=right data-sort-value="0.54" | 540 m || 
|-id=885 bgcolor=#FFC2E0
| 480885 ||  || — || January 13, 2002 || Socorro || LINEAR || APO +1km || align=right data-sort-value="0.88" | 880 m || 
|-id=886 bgcolor=#fefefe
| 480886 ||  || — || January 13, 2002 || Kitt Peak || Spacewatch || — || align=right data-sort-value="0.74" | 740 m || 
|-id=887 bgcolor=#d6d6d6
| 480887 ||  || — || January 19, 2002 || Kitt Peak || Spacewatch || — || align=right | 2.5 km || 
|-id=888 bgcolor=#fefefe
| 480888 ||  || — || March 6, 2002 || Palomar || NEAT || — || align=right | 1.00 km || 
|-id=889 bgcolor=#fefefe
| 480889 ||  || — || March 19, 2002 || Anderson Mesa || LONEOS || — || align=right data-sort-value="0.92" | 920 m || 
|-id=890 bgcolor=#fefefe
| 480890 ||  || — || March 20, 2002 || Socorro || LINEAR || — || align=right | 1.6 km || 
|-id=891 bgcolor=#fefefe
| 480891 ||  || — || May 8, 2002 || Socorro || LINEAR || H || align=right data-sort-value="0.86" | 860 m || 
|-id=892 bgcolor=#fefefe
| 480892 ||  || — || July 12, 2002 || Palomar || NEAT || — || align=right | 1.6 km || 
|-id=893 bgcolor=#fefefe
| 480893 ||  || — || July 9, 2002 || Socorro || LINEAR || H || align=right | 1.0 km || 
|-id=894 bgcolor=#fefefe
| 480894 ||  || — || August 6, 2002 || Palomar || NEAT || H || align=right data-sort-value="0.67" | 670 m || 
|-id=895 bgcolor=#fefefe
| 480895 ||  || — || August 14, 2002 || Socorro || LINEAR || — || align=right data-sort-value="0.62" | 620 m || 
|-id=896 bgcolor=#E9E9E9
| 480896 ||  || — || August 12, 2002 || Socorro || LINEAR || — || align=right | 1.6 km || 
|-id=897 bgcolor=#FA8072
| 480897 ||  || — || August 16, 2002 || Socorro || LINEAR || — || align=right data-sort-value="0.71" | 710 m || 
|-id=898 bgcolor=#fefefe
| 480898 ||  || — || August 18, 2002 || Palomar || NEAT || — || align=right data-sort-value="0.88" | 880 m || 
|-id=899 bgcolor=#E9E9E9
| 480899 ||  || — || August 16, 2002 || Palomar || NEAT || ADE || align=right | 1.8 km || 
|-id=900 bgcolor=#fefefe
| 480900 ||  || — || August 29, 2002 || Palomar || NEAT || — || align=right data-sort-value="0.51" | 510 m || 
|}

480901–481000 

|-bgcolor=#fefefe
| 480901 ||  || — || August 27, 2002 || Palomar || NEAT || — || align=right data-sort-value="0.54" | 540 m || 
|-id=902 bgcolor=#fefefe
| 480902 ||  || — || September 5, 2002 || Anderson Mesa || LONEOS || — || align=right data-sort-value="0.77" | 770 m || 
|-id=903 bgcolor=#E9E9E9
| 480903 ||  || — || September 12, 2002 || Haleakala || NEAT || — || align=right | 1.8 km || 
|-id=904 bgcolor=#FA8072
| 480904 ||  || — || September 14, 2002 || Palomar || NEAT || — || align=right data-sort-value="0.78" | 780 m || 
|-id=905 bgcolor=#fefefe
| 480905 ||  || — || September 9, 2002 || Palomar || NEAT || — || align=right data-sort-value="0.68" | 680 m || 
|-id=906 bgcolor=#fefefe
| 480906 ||  || — || September 28, 2002 || Palomar || NEAT || (2076)critical || align=right data-sort-value="0.68" | 680 m || 
|-id=907 bgcolor=#E9E9E9
| 480907 ||  || — || September 17, 2002 || Palomar || NEAT || — || align=right | 1.9 km || 
|-id=908 bgcolor=#E9E9E9
| 480908 ||  || — || October 2, 2002 || Socorro || LINEAR || — || align=right | 2.3 km || 
|-id=909 bgcolor=#E9E9E9
| 480909 ||  || — || October 4, 2002 || Socorro || LINEAR || — || align=right | 1.8 km || 
|-id=910 bgcolor=#fefefe
| 480910 ||  || — || October 4, 2002 || Palomar || NEAT || — || align=right data-sort-value="0.71" | 710 m || 
|-id=911 bgcolor=#E9E9E9
| 480911 ||  || — || October 4, 2002 || Socorro || LINEAR || — || align=right | 2.2 km || 
|-id=912 bgcolor=#E9E9E9
| 480912 ||  || — || July 13, 2002 || Socorro || LINEAR || — || align=right | 3.3 km || 
|-id=913 bgcolor=#E9E9E9
| 480913 ||  || — || October 4, 2002 || Apache Point || SDSS || — || align=right | 2.1 km || 
|-id=914 bgcolor=#E9E9E9
| 480914 ||  || — || October 30, 2002 || Apache Point || SDSS || — || align=right | 3.6 km || 
|-id=915 bgcolor=#fefefe
| 480915 ||  || — || November 1, 2002 || Palomar || NEAT || — || align=right data-sort-value="0.94" | 940 m || 
|-id=916 bgcolor=#E9E9E9
| 480916 ||  || — || November 7, 2002 || Needville || Needville Obs. || — || align=right | 2.7 km || 
|-id=917 bgcolor=#fefefe
| 480917 ||  || — || November 13, 2002 || Kitt Peak || Spacewatch || critical || align=right data-sort-value="0.45" | 450 m || 
|-id=918 bgcolor=#FA8072
| 480918 ||  || — || November 14, 2002 || Socorro || LINEAR || — || align=right | 1.1 km || 
|-id=919 bgcolor=#E9E9E9
| 480919 ||  || — || November 16, 2002 || Las Cruces || D. S. Dixon || — || align=right | 1.4 km || 
|-id=920 bgcolor=#fefefe
| 480920 ||  || — || November 16, 2002 || Palomar || NEAT || — || align=right data-sort-value="0.79" | 790 m || 
|-id=921 bgcolor=#E9E9E9
| 480921 ||  || — || December 6, 2002 || Socorro || LINEAR || — || align=right | 2.5 km || 
|-id=922 bgcolor=#FFC2E0
| 480922 ||  || — || December 7, 2002 || Socorro || LINEAR || ATE || align=right data-sort-value="0.30" | 300 m || 
|-id=923 bgcolor=#E9E9E9
| 480923 ||  || — || December 10, 2002 || Socorro || LINEAR || — || align=right | 2.2 km || 
|-id=924 bgcolor=#FA8072
| 480924 ||  || — || December 10, 2002 || Socorro || LINEAR || — || align=right | 1.4 km || 
|-id=925 bgcolor=#fefefe
| 480925 ||  || — || December 10, 2002 || Socorro || LINEAR || — || align=right | 1.4 km || 
|-id=926 bgcolor=#fefefe
| 480926 ||  || — || December 3, 2002 || Palomar || NEAT || — || align=right data-sort-value="0.73" | 730 m || 
|-id=927 bgcolor=#FFC2E0
| 480927 ||  || — || December 28, 2002 || Socorro || LINEAR || APO || align=right data-sort-value="0.86" | 860 m || 
|-id=928 bgcolor=#fefefe
| 480928 ||  || — || January 5, 2003 || Socorro || LINEAR || — || align=right | 1.3 km || 
|-id=929 bgcolor=#fefefe
| 480929 ||  || — || January 25, 2003 || Palomar || NEAT || — || align=right | 1.1 km || 
|-id=930 bgcolor=#fefefe
| 480930 ||  || — || January 26, 2003 || Anderson Mesa || LONEOS || — || align=right | 1.1 km || 
|-id=931 bgcolor=#fefefe
| 480931 ||  || — || April 7, 2003 || Socorro || LINEAR || — || align=right | 1.9 km || 
|-id=932 bgcolor=#fefefe
| 480932 ||  || — || April 26, 2003 || Kitt Peak || Spacewatch || — || align=right | 1.3 km || 
|-id=933 bgcolor=#fefefe
| 480933 ||  || — || May 1, 2003 || Kitt Peak || Spacewatch || — || align=right data-sort-value="0.82" | 820 m || 
|-id=934 bgcolor=#FFC2E0
| 480934 ||  || — || April 1, 2003 || Socorro || LINEAR || AMO +1km || align=right | 1.1 km || 
|-id=935 bgcolor=#E9E9E9
| 480935 ||  || — || July 31, 2003 || Reedy Creek || J. Broughton || — || align=right | 1.3 km || 
|-id=936 bgcolor=#FFC2E0
| 480936 ||  || — || August 21, 2003 || Socorro || LINEAR || APOPHA || align=right data-sort-value="0.54" | 540 m || 
|-id=937 bgcolor=#E9E9E9
| 480937 ||  || — || August 22, 2003 || Socorro || LINEAR || — || align=right | 1.0 km || 
|-id=938 bgcolor=#E9E9E9
| 480938 ||  || — || August 22, 2003 || Palomar || NEAT || — || align=right | 1.2 km || 
|-id=939 bgcolor=#fefefe
| 480939 ||  || — || September 15, 2003 || Anderson Mesa || LONEOS || — || align=right data-sort-value="0.62" | 620 m || 
|-id=940 bgcolor=#E9E9E9
| 480940 ||  || — || September 20, 2003 || Socorro || LINEAR || — || align=right | 2.2 km || 
|-id=941 bgcolor=#E9E9E9
| 480941 ||  || — || September 20, 2003 || Socorro || LINEAR || — || align=right | 1.1 km || 
|-id=942 bgcolor=#E9E9E9
| 480942 ||  || — || September 18, 2003 || Anderson Mesa || LONEOS || — || align=right | 1.4 km || 
|-id=943 bgcolor=#E9E9E9
| 480943 ||  || — || September 20, 2003 || Anderson Mesa || LONEOS || (5) || align=right data-sort-value="0.91" | 910 m || 
|-id=944 bgcolor=#E9E9E9
| 480944 ||  || — || September 21, 2003 || Anderson Mesa || LONEOS || — || align=right | 1.7 km || 
|-id=945 bgcolor=#E9E9E9
| 480945 ||  || — || September 27, 2003 || Desert Eagle || W. K. Y. Yeung || — || align=right | 1.4 km || 
|-id=946 bgcolor=#E9E9E9
| 480946 ||  || — || September 26, 2003 || Socorro || LINEAR || — || align=right | 1.2 km || 
|-id=947 bgcolor=#E9E9E9
| 480947 ||  || — || September 30, 2003 || Socorro || LINEAR || — || align=right | 1.6 km || 
|-id=948 bgcolor=#E9E9E9
| 480948 ||  || — || September 21, 2003 || Kitt Peak || Spacewatch || — || align=right | 1.2 km || 
|-id=949 bgcolor=#E9E9E9
| 480949 ||  || — || September 28, 2003 || Socorro || LINEAR || — || align=right | 2.2 km || 
|-id=950 bgcolor=#E9E9E9
| 480950 ||  || — || September 16, 2003 || Anderson Mesa || LONEOS || — || align=right | 1.2 km || 
|-id=951 bgcolor=#E9E9E9
| 480951 ||  || — || September 16, 2003 || Kitt Peak || Spacewatch || — || align=right data-sort-value="0.98" | 980 m || 
|-id=952 bgcolor=#E9E9E9
| 480952 ||  || — || September 17, 2003 || Kitt Peak || Spacewatch || — || align=right | 1.5 km || 
|-id=953 bgcolor=#E9E9E9
| 480953 ||  || — || September 27, 2003 || Apache Point || SDSS || — || align=right | 1.4 km || 
|-id=954 bgcolor=#E9E9E9
| 480954 ||  || — || September 16, 2003 || Kitt Peak || Spacewatch || — || align=right data-sort-value="0.96" | 960 m || 
|-id=955 bgcolor=#E9E9E9
| 480955 ||  || — || September 19, 2003 || Kitt Peak || Spacewatch || — || align=right | 1.3 km || 
|-id=956 bgcolor=#d6d6d6
| 480956 ||  || — || September 28, 2003 || Apache Point || SDSS || — || align=right | 2.9 km || 
|-id=957 bgcolor=#E9E9E9
| 480957 ||  || — || September 21, 2003 || Kitt Peak || Spacewatch || — || align=right data-sort-value="0.85" | 850 m || 
|-id=958 bgcolor=#E9E9E9
| 480958 ||  || — || October 3, 2003 || Kitt Peak || Spacewatch || (5) || align=right data-sort-value="0.88" | 880 m || 
|-id=959 bgcolor=#E9E9E9
| 480959 ||  || — || September 28, 2003 || Kitt Peak || Spacewatch || fast? || align=right | 1.2 km || 
|-id=960 bgcolor=#FA8072
| 480960 ||  || — || October 16, 2003 || Kitt Peak || Spacewatch || — || align=right data-sort-value="0.50" | 500 m || 
|-id=961 bgcolor=#E9E9E9
| 480961 ||  || — || October 16, 2003 || Kitt Peak || Spacewatch || — || align=right data-sort-value="0.92" | 920 m || 
|-id=962 bgcolor=#FA8072
| 480962 ||  || — || September 21, 2003 || Anderson Mesa || LONEOS || — || align=right | 1.7 km || 
|-id=963 bgcolor=#E9E9E9
| 480963 ||  || — || September 28, 2003 || Socorro || LINEAR || fast? || align=right | 1.4 km || 
|-id=964 bgcolor=#E9E9E9
| 480964 ||  || — || October 18, 2003 || Anderson Mesa || LONEOS || — || align=right | 1.5 km || 
|-id=965 bgcolor=#E9E9E9
| 480965 ||  || — || October 21, 2003 || Palomar || NEAT || — || align=right | 1.4 km || 
|-id=966 bgcolor=#E9E9E9
| 480966 ||  || — || October 22, 2003 || Socorro || LINEAR || — || align=right | 1.6 km || 
|-id=967 bgcolor=#E9E9E9
| 480967 ||  || — || October 5, 2003 || Kitt Peak || Spacewatch || — || align=right | 1.5 km || 
|-id=968 bgcolor=#E9E9E9
| 480968 ||  || — || October 25, 2003 || Socorro || LINEAR || (1547) || align=right | 1.6 km || 
|-id=969 bgcolor=#E9E9E9
| 480969 ||  || — || October 16, 2003 || Kitt Peak || Spacewatch || — || align=right data-sort-value="0.87" | 870 m || 
|-id=970 bgcolor=#E9E9E9
| 480970 ||  || — || October 18, 2003 || Palomar || NEAT || — || align=right | 1.3 km || 
|-id=971 bgcolor=#E9E9E9
| 480971 ||  || — || October 22, 2003 || Apache Point || SDSS || KON || align=right | 3.1 km || 
|-id=972 bgcolor=#E9E9E9
| 480972 ||  || — || October 19, 2003 || Apache Point || SDSS || (5) || align=right data-sort-value="0.58" | 580 m || 
|-id=973 bgcolor=#E9E9E9
| 480973 ||  || — || October 20, 2003 || Kitt Peak || Spacewatch || — || align=right | 1.3 km || 
|-id=974 bgcolor=#E9E9E9
| 480974 ||  || — || November 18, 2003 || Kitt Peak || Spacewatch || EUN || align=right | 1.1 km || 
|-id=975 bgcolor=#fefefe
| 480975 ||  || — || November 16, 2003 || Kitt Peak || Spacewatch || H || align=right data-sort-value="0.67" | 670 m || 
|-id=976 bgcolor=#E9E9E9
| 480976 ||  || — || November 19, 2003 || Kitt Peak || Spacewatch || — || align=right | 1.1 km || 
|-id=977 bgcolor=#fefefe
| 480977 ||  || — || November 21, 2003 || Socorro || LINEAR || — || align=right data-sort-value="0.59" | 590 m || 
|-id=978 bgcolor=#E9E9E9
| 480978 ||  || — || November 19, 2003 || Anderson Mesa || LONEOS || (1547) || align=right | 1.6 km || 
|-id=979 bgcolor=#E9E9E9
| 480979 ||  || — || November 20, 2003 || Catalina || CSS || — || align=right | 1.9 km || 
|-id=980 bgcolor=#E9E9E9
| 480980 ||  || — || October 29, 2003 || Anderson Mesa || LONEOS || — || align=right | 1.3 km || 
|-id=981 bgcolor=#E9E9E9
| 480981 ||  || — || November 21, 2003 || Socorro || LINEAR || — || align=right | 2.5 km || 
|-id=982 bgcolor=#fefefe
| 480982 ||  || — || December 18, 2003 || Socorro || LINEAR || H || align=right data-sort-value="0.70" | 700 m || 
|-id=983 bgcolor=#E9E9E9
| 480983 ||  || — || December 18, 2003 || Kitt Peak || Spacewatch || (1547)fast? || align=right | 1.8 km || 
|-id=984 bgcolor=#FFC2E0
| 480984 ||  || — || December 22, 2003 || Socorro || LINEAR || AMOcritical || align=right data-sort-value="0.34" | 340 m || 
|-id=985 bgcolor=#E9E9E9
| 480985 ||  || — || December 18, 2003 || Socorro || LINEAR || JUN || align=right | 1.1 km || 
|-id=986 bgcolor=#fefefe
| 480986 ||  || — || December 19, 2003 || Socorro || LINEAR || H || align=right data-sort-value="0.90" | 900 m || 
|-id=987 bgcolor=#fefefe
| 480987 ||  || — || December 29, 2003 || Socorro || LINEAR || H || align=right data-sort-value="0.80" | 800 m || 
|-id=988 bgcolor=#E9E9E9
| 480988 ||  || — || January 21, 2004 || Socorro || LINEAR || MAR || align=right | 1.1 km || 
|-id=989 bgcolor=#fefefe
| 480989 ||  || — || January 28, 2004 || Catalina || CSS || H || align=right data-sort-value="0.64" | 640 m || 
|-id=990 bgcolor=#FA8072
| 480990 ||  || — || January 29, 2004 || Socorro || LINEAR || — || align=right | 1.2 km || 
|-id=991 bgcolor=#E9E9E9
| 480991 ||  || — || January 19, 2004 || Kitt Peak || Spacewatch ||  || align=right | 1.8 km || 
|-id=992 bgcolor=#E9E9E9
| 480992 ||  || — || January 19, 2004 || Kitt Peak || Spacewatch || — || align=right | 2.0 km || 
|-id=993 bgcolor=#E9E9E9
| 480993 ||  || — || February 10, 2004 || Socorro || LINEAR || — || align=right | 2.2 km || 
|-id=994 bgcolor=#E9E9E9
| 480994 ||  || — || January 30, 2004 || Socorro || LINEAR || — || align=right | 1.8 km || 
|-id=995 bgcolor=#E9E9E9
| 480995 ||  || — || February 13, 2004 || Kitt Peak || Spacewatch || — || align=right | 2.0 km || 
|-id=996 bgcolor=#E9E9E9
| 480996 ||  || — || February 17, 2004 || Kitt Peak || Spacewatch || — || align=right | 2.7 km || 
|-id=997 bgcolor=#FA8072
| 480997 ||  || — || February 23, 2004 || Socorro || LINEAR || — || align=right | 1.8 km || 
|-id=998 bgcolor=#E9E9E9
| 480998 ||  || — || February 19, 2004 || Socorro || LINEAR || — || align=right | 1.8 km || 
|-id=999 bgcolor=#E9E9E9
| 480999 ||  || — || March 15, 2004 || Kitt Peak || Spacewatch || — || align=right | 1.8 km || 
|-id=000 bgcolor=#E9E9E9
| 481000 ||  || — || February 13, 2004 || Kitt Peak || Spacewatch || DOR || align=right | 2.6 km || 
|}

References

External links 
 Discovery Circumstances: Numbered Minor Planets (480001)–(485000) (IAU Minor Planet Center)

0480